= Cortico-basal ganglia-thalamo-cortical loop =

System of neural circuits in the brain

- Connections of the basal ganglia.

Details
- Part of: Cerebrum

The cortico-basal ganglia-thalamo-cortical loop (CBGTC loop) is a system of neural circuits in the brain. The loop involves connections between the cortex, the basal ganglia, the thalamus, and back to the cortex. It is of particular relevance to hyperkinetic and hypokinetic movement disorders, such as Parkinson's disease and Huntington's disease, as well as to mental disorders of control, such as attention deficit hyperactivity disorder (ADHD), obsessive–compulsive disorder (OCD), and Tourette syndrome.

The CBGTC loop primarily consists of modulatory dopaminergic projections from the pars compacta of the substantia nigra, and ventral tegmental area as well as excitatory glutamatergic projections from the cortex to the striatum, where these projections form synapses with excitatory and inhibitory pathways that relay back to the cortex. The loop was originally proposed as a part of a model of the basal ganglia called the parallel processing model, which has been criticized and modified into another model called the center surround model.

Current organization schemes characterize cortico-basal ganglia interactions as segregated parallel processing, meaning there is little convergence of distinct cortical areas in the basal ganglia. This is thought to explain the topographically organized functionality of the striatum. The striatum is organized on a rostro-caudal axis, with the rostral putamen and caudate serving associative and cognitive functions and the caudal areas serving sensorimotor function. Sometimes when the striatum is the expressed target the loop is referred to as the cortico-striatal-thalamic-cortical loop.

== Neuroanatomy ==
Indirect and direct pathways. Some neuroanatomy is excluded for simplicity.

The two major input structures of the circuit are the striatum and the subthalamic nucleus (STN). The striatum receives inputs from both the cortex and the pars compacta of the substantia nigra (SNc), while the STN only receives cortical inputs.

Two pathways emerge from the striatum. One pathway is called the indirect (or NoGo) pathway and is inhibitory. This projects to and inhibits the globus pallidus externus (GPe), resulting in the disinhibition of the globus pallidus internus (GPi), leading to inhibition of the thalamus. This pathway also, as a result of inhibiting the GPe, disinhibits the subthalamic nucleus, which results in excitation of the GPi, and therefore inhibition of the thalamus.

The second pathway, is called the direct (or Go) pathway and is excitatory. This pathway inhibits the GPi, resulting in the disinhibition of the thalamus. The direct pathway mostly consists of monosynaptic connections driven by dopamine receptor D1, adenosine A1 receptor, and muscarinic acetylcholine receptor M4, while the indirect pathway relies on connections driven by dopamine receptor D2, adenosine A2A receptor, and muscarinic acetylcholine receptor M1.

The parallel CBGTC loops have been segregated according to the functions of associated cortical regions. One scheme involves the division into limbic and motor loops, with the motor loops containing indirect and direct pathways, which are in turn interconnected with the limbic loop that projects into the ventral striatum. The loop has also been divided into limbic, associative, oculomotor, and motor circuits to explain the role of dopamine in the basal ganglia on motivational states. A five loop division based on primary cortical targets has been described as follows:

- A motor circuit originating in the supplementary motor area, motor cortex, and somatosensory cortex, which in turn projects to the putamen, which projects to the ventrolateral GPi and caudolateral SNr, before returning to the cortex via the ventralis lateralis pars oralis and ventralis lateralis pars medialis.
- An oculomotor circuit originating in the frontal eye fields projecting to the body of the caudate, and returning via the caudal dorsomedial GPi/ventromedial SNr, and then the lateral ventralis anterior pars magnocellularis and medialis dorsalis pars paralarnellaris.
- A dorsolateral prefrontal circuit involving projections from the dlPFC and posterior parietal cortex, that projects to the dorsolateral head of the caudate, which in turn projects to the lateral dorsomedial GPi/rostrolateral SNr, which projects to the ventralis anterior pars parvocellularis and medialis dorsalis pars parvocellularis.
- A lateral orbitofrontal circuit projecting to the ventromedial caudate head, which projects through the medial dorsomedial GPi/rostromedial SNr to the medial ventralis medialis pars magnocellularis/medialis dorsalis pars magnocellularis.
- An anterior cingulate circuit that involves projections from the ACC to the ventral striatum, through the rostrolateral GPi/VP/rostrodorsal SNr, which returns via the posteromedial medialis dorsalis.

A problem identified with the current anatomy of the circuit is that the time delay between the direct and indirect pathways should result in this circuit not working. To overcome this, the center surround hypothesis posits a hyperdirect pathway from the cortex would inhibit other inputs besides one focused cortical input. However, the timing of basal ganglia activity and limb moment, as well as lesion studies do not support this hypothesis.

== Function ==
Two models have been proposed to explain how actions are selected in the basal ganglia. The actor-critic model suggests that actions are generated and evaluated by a "critic" in the ventral striatum, while the actions are carried out by an "actor" in the dorsal striatum. Another model proposes the basal ganglia acts as a selection mechanism, where actions are generated in the cortex and are selected based on context by the basal ganglia. The CBGTC loop is also involved in reward discounting, with firing increasing with an unexpected or greater than expected reward. One review supported the idea that the cortex was involved in learning actions regardless of their outcome, while the basal ganglia was involved in selecting appropriate actions based on associative reward based trial and error learning.

== Role in disease ==
The CBGTC loop has been implicated in many diseases. For example, in Parkinson's disease, degeneration of dopaminergic neurons leading to decreased activity of the excitatory pathway is thought to result in hypokinesia, and in Huntington's disease, degeneration of GABAergic neurons driving the inhibitory pathway is thought to result in the jerky body movements. The co-degeneration of limbic projections along with motor projections may result in many of the psychiatric symptoms of these primarily motor illnesses. In OCD, the loop may be dysfunctional, with an imbalance between the indirect and direct pathways resulting in unwanted thoughts, getting "stuck". In ADHD, decreased tonic dopaminergic signaling resulting in excessive discounting of delayed rewards is thought to result in decreased attention.

== Research ==
The CBGTC loop has been studied in relation to consciousness, action selection, in relation to other circuits, and in the context of memory and cognition. The CBGTC loop model has been criticized as oversimplified and too rigidly applied, given evidence of anatomical and functional overlap and interactions between the direct and indirect pathways. The loop has also been researched in the context of deep brain stimulation. As of 2013 there was intense debate with regards to division of the circuit, pathway interactions, number of pathways and general anatomy.
