= Movement disorder =

- Specialty: Neurology; Psychiatry

Movement disorders are clinical syndromes with either an excess of movement or a paucity of voluntary and involuntary movements, unrelated to weakness or spasticity. Movement disorders are conventionally divided into two major categories- hyperkinetic and hypokinetic.

Hypokinetic movement disorders	Hyperkinetic movement disorders
Rigidity; Akinesia (lack of movement); Hypokinesia (reduced amplitude of movements); Bradykinesia (slow movement), and rigidity.	Tremor (Rest, postural, action); Dystonia (Focal, segmental, generalized); Chorea and ballism; Myoclonus; Tics / Tic disorders

In primary movement disorders, the abnormal movement is the primary manifestation of the disorder. In secondary movement disorders, the abnormal movement is a manifestation of another systemic or neurological disorder. Treatment depends upon the underlying disorder.

== Classification ==
Comprehensive list of symptoms, syndromes and diseases.

Movement Disorders	ICD-9-CM	ICD-10-CM
Hypokinetic Movement disorders
Poliomyelitis, acute	045	A80
Amyotrophic lateral sclerosis, ALS (Lou Gehrig's disease)	335.20	G12.21
Parkinson's disease (Primary or Idiopathic Parkinsonism)	332	G20
Secondary Parkinsonism		G21
Parkinson plus syndromes		
Pantothenate kinase-associated neurodegeneration		G23.0
Progressive Supranuclear Ophthalmoplegia		G23.1
Striatonigral degeneration		G23.2
Multiple sclerosis	340	G35
Radiation-induced polyneuropathy (brachial and lumbar plexopathies)		G62.82
Muscular dystrophy	359.0	G71.0
Cerebral palsy	343	G80
Rheumatoid arthritis	714	M05
Hyperkinetic Movement disorders
GLUT1 deficiency syndrome		E74.810
Attention-deficit hyperactivity disorder (with hyperactivity)	314.01	F90
Tic disorders (involuntary, compulsive, repetitive, stereotyped)		F95
Tourette's syndrome		F95.2
Stereotypic movement disorder		F98.5
Huntington's disease (Huntington's chorea)	333.4	G10
Dystonia		G24
Drug induced dystonia		G24.0
Idiopathic familial dystonia	333.6	G24.1
Idiopathic nonfamilial dystonia	333.7	G24.2
Spasmodic torticollis	333.83	G24.3
Idiopathic orofacial dystonia		G24.4
Blepharospasm	333.81	G24.5
Other dystonias		G24.8
Other extrapyramidal movement disorders		G25
Essential tremor	333.1	G25.0
Drug induced tremor		G25.1
Other specified form of tremor		G25.2
Myoclonus	333.2	G25.3
Chorea (rapid, involuntary movement)		
Drug induced chorea		G25.4
Drug-induced tics and tics of organic origin	333.3	G25.6
Paroxysmal nocturnal limb movement		G25.80
Painful legs (or arms), moving toes (or fingers) syndrome		G25.81
Sporadic restless leg syndrome		G25.82
Familial restless leg syndrome		G25.83
Stiff-person syndrome	333.91	G25.84
Ballismus (violent involuntary rapid and irregular movements)		G25.85
Hemiballismus (affecting only one side of the body)		G25.85
Myokymia, facial		G51.4
Neuromyotonia (Isaacs Syndrome)	359.29	G71.19
Opsoclonus	379.59	H57
Rheumatic chorea (Sydenham's chorea)		I02
Abnormal head movements		R25.0
Tremor unspecified		R25.1
Cramp and spasm		R25.2
Fasciculation		R25.3
Athetosis (contorted torsion or twisting)	333.71	R25.8
Dyskinesia (abnormal, involuntary movement)		
Tardive dyskinesia		

== Diagnosis ==
Step I : Decide the dominant type of movement disorder

Step II : Make differential diagnosis of the particular disorder

Step II: Confirm the diagnosis by lab tests

- Metabolic screening
- Microbiology
- Immunology
- CSF examination
- Genetics
- Imaging
- Neurophysiological tests
- Pharmacological tests
- Sleep study

== History ==
Vesalius and Piccolomini in 16th century distinguished subcortical nuclei from cortex and white matter. However Willis' conceptualized the corpus striatum as the seat of motor power in the late 17th century. In mid-19th-century movement disorders were localized to striatum by Choreaby Broadbent and Jackson, and athetosis by Hammond. By the late 19th century, many movement disorders were described, but for most no pathologic correlate was known.

== See also ==
- Gait abnormality
- Extrapyramidal symptoms
