= FRRS1L =

Protein-coding gene in humans

An Error has occurred retrieving Wikidata item for infobox Ferric chelate reductase 1-like is a protein that in humans is encoded by the FRRS1L gene. This protein makes up part of a type of AMPA receptor involved in communication between cells in the brain. Loss-of-function mutations to FRRS1L are associated with early infantile epilepsy, developmental delay, progressive dyskinesia, diffuse hypotonia, and global loss of function.
