= Heinz Steiner =

Swiss-American neuroscientist

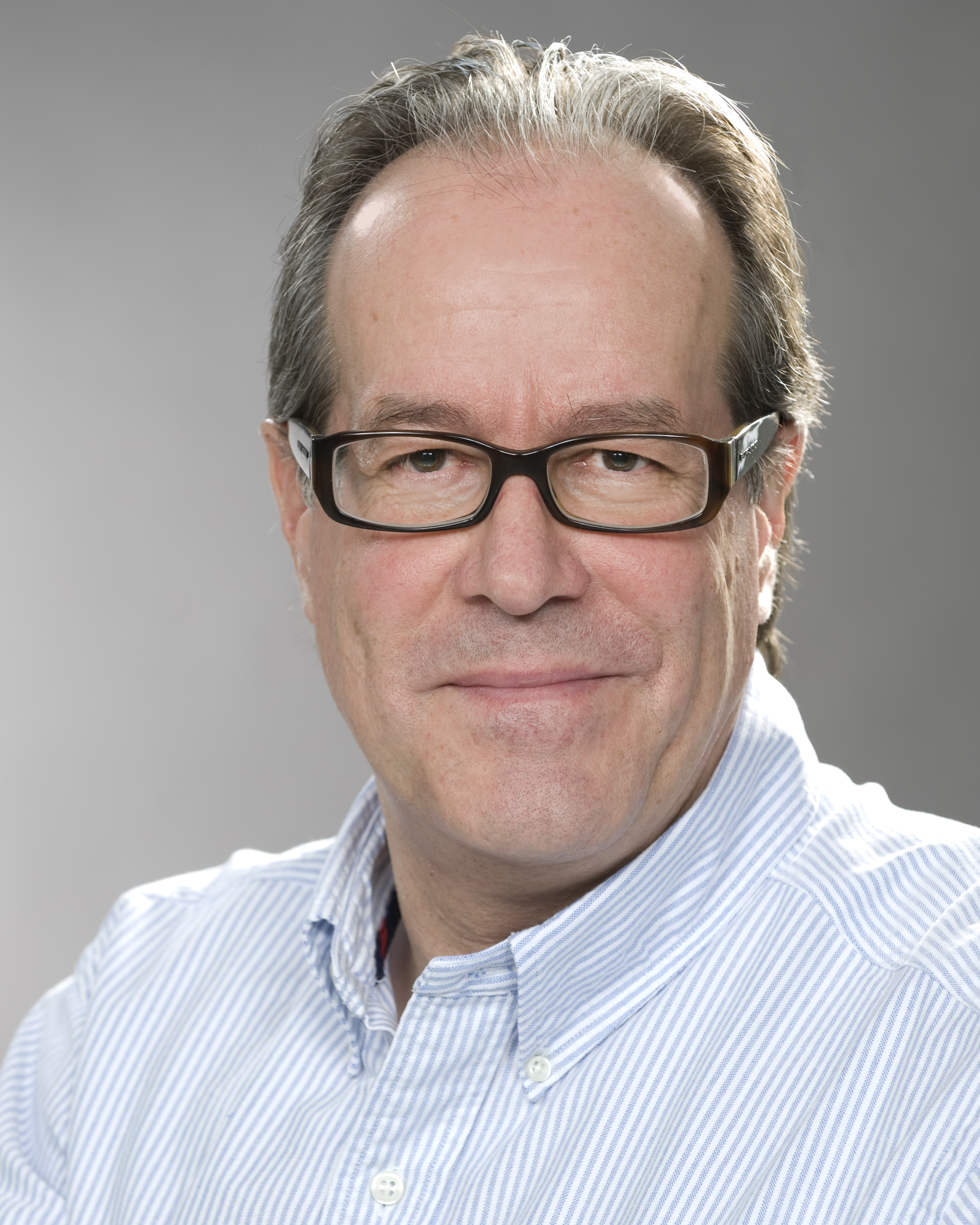
- Education: Swiss Federal Institute of Technology; University of Düsseldorf
- Scientific career
- Fields: Neuroscience; Pharmacology
- Workplaces: Chicago Medical School, Rosalind Franklin University of Medicine and Science
- Doctoral advisor: Joseph P. Huston

Heinz Steiner (born 1 July 1956 in Birrwil, AG, Switzerland) is a Swiss-American neuroscientist and Professor Emeritus of Cellular and Molecular Pharmacology at the Chicago Medical School, Rosalind Franklin University of Medicine and Science. He was also a Principal Investigator in the Stanson Toshok Center for Brain Function and Repair at Rosalind Franklin University.

== Education and academic career ==
Steiner received a M.S. degree in Biology from the Swiss Federal Institute of Technology (ETH) in Zürich, Switzerland, under the guidance of the behavioral biologist Prof. Karl Bättig. He earned his doctoral degree (Dr. rer. nat.) in Physiological Psychology from the University of Düsseldorf, Germany (1989), with Prof. Joseph P. Huston. Steiner pursued his postdoctoral work with Dr. Charles Gerfen in the Laboratory of Cell Biology at the National Institute of Mental Health (NIMH) in Bethesda, MD, USA (1990-1995).

He then became a Research Assistant Professor in the Department of Anatomy and Neurobiology at the University of Tennessee, College of Medicine and The Center for Neuroscience in Memphis, TN.

Steiner was recruited to the faculty of the Department of Cellular and Molecular Pharmacology at the Chicago Medical School in 2000 and served as the department chair from 2011-2022. In 2018, Steiner joined the newly founded Stanson Toshok Center for Brain Function and Repair at Rosalind Franklin University until his retirement in 2024.

Steiner is a series editor of Elsevier’s Handbook of Behavioral Neuroscience series.

He is also an editor of the “Handbook of Basal Ganglia Structure and Function”, edition 1 (Vol. 20, 2010) and edition 2 (Vol. 24, 2016).

== Research ==
Steiner’s research centered on the functional organization of the basal ganglia, a forebrain system important for movement control, action selection, motor learning and motivational aspects of behavior.

His research focused on the role of the neurotransmitters dopamine and serotonin in the regulation of basal ganglia – cortical interactions. One of the main objectives of this work was to understand how treatments with dopaminergic drugs (e.g., psychostimulants such as cocaine and methylphenidate (Ritalin)) and serotonergic medications (e.g., SSRI antidepressants) interact to cause changes in gene regulation in neurons of the striatum, the most prominent part of the basal ganglia, and how these molecular alterations affect basal ganglia function and behavior.

Steiner and his team were the first to demonstrate that prototypical SSRI antidepressants such as fluoxetine (Prozac) potentiate addiction-related gene regulation in the striatum induced by psychostimulant medications and enhance the abuse/addiction liability of these psychostimulants in animal models of substance use disorder.

His work also revealed that novel atypical SSRIs can attenuate L-DOPA-induced abnormal gene regulation in the striatum and resulting dyskinesia in an animal model of Parkinson’s disease.

== Selected publications ==
- Steiner, H.; Gerfen, Charles R. (1998-10-23). "Role of dynorphin and enkephalin in the regulation of striatal output pathways and behavior". Experimental Brain Research. 123 (1–2): 60–76. doi:10.1007/s002210050545. ISSN 0014-4819. PMID 9835393.
- Steiner, Heinz; Kitai, Stephen T. (2000-07-15). "Regulation of Rat Cortex Function by D1 Dopamine Receptors in the Striatum". The Journal of Neuroscience. 20 (14): 5449–5460. doi:10.1523/JNEUROSCI.20-14-05449.2000. ISSN 0270-6474. PMC 6772329. PMID 10884328.
- Willuhn, Ingo; Sun, Weiwen; Steiner, Heinz (2003). "Topography of cocaine-induced gene regulation in the rat striatum: relationship to cortical inputs and role of behavioural context". European Journal of Neuroscience. 17 (5): 1053–1066. doi:10.1046/j.1460-9568.2003.02525.x. ISSN 0953-816X. PMID 12653981.
- Yano, M; Steiner, H (2007). "Methylphenidate and cocaine: the same effects on gene regulation?". Trends in Pharmacological Sciences. 28 (11): 588–596. doi:10.1016/j.tips.2007.10.004. PMID 17963850.
- Van Waes, Vincent; Beverley, Joel; Marinelli, Michela; Steiner, Heinz (2010). "Selective serotonin reuptake inhibitor antidepressants potentiate methylphenidate (Ritalin)-induced gene regulation in the adolescent striatum". European Journal of Neuroscience. 32 (3): 435–447. doi:10.1111/j.1460-9568.2010.07294.x. ISSN 0953-816X. PMC 2921647. PMID 20704593.
- Steiner, Heinz; Van Waes, Vincent; Marinelli, Michela (2010). "Fluoxetine Potentiates Methylphenidate-Induced Gene Regulation in Addiction-Related Brain Regions: Concerns for Use of Cognitive Enhancers?". Biological Psychiatry. 67 (6): 592–594. doi:10.1016/j.biopsych.2009.10.004. ISSN 0006-3223. PMC 2829342.
- Steiner, H. (2016), Psychostimulant-Induced Gene Regulation in Striatal Circuits, Handbook of Behavioral Neuroscience, vol. 24, Elsevier, pp. 639–672, doi:10.1016/b978-0-12-802206-1.00031-3, ISBN 978-0-12-802206-1
- Padovan-Neto, Fernando E.; Patterson, Santanna; F. Voelkner, Nivea M.; Altwal, Feras; Beverley, Joel A.; West, Anthony R.; Steiner, Heinz (2020). "Selective Regulation of 5-HT1B Serotonin Receptor Expression in the Striatum by Dopamine Depletion and Repeated L-DOPA Treatment: Relationship to L-DOPA-Induced Dyskinesias". Molecular Neurobiology. 57 (2): 736–751. doi:10.1007/s12035-019-01739-x. ISSN 0893-7648. PMC 7035192.
- Moon, Connor; Marion, Matt; Thanos, Panayotis K.; Steiner, Heinz (2021). "Fluoxetine Potentiates Oral Methylphenidate-Induced Gene Regulation in the Rat Striatum". Molecular Neurobiology. 58 (10): 4856–4870. doi:10.1007/s12035-021-02466-y. ISSN 0893-7648. PMC 8500935. PMID 34213723.
- Senior, Daniela; McCarthy, Madison; Ahmed, Rania; Klein, Shannon; Lee, Wen Xuan; Hadjiargyrou, Michael; Komatsu, David; Steiner, Heinz; Thanos, Panayotis K. (2023). "Chronic oral methylphenidate plus fluoxetine treatment in adolescent rats increases cocaine self-administration". Addiction Neuroscience. 8 100127. doi:10.1016/j.addicn.2023.100127. PMC 10809890. PMID 38274857.
- Hrabak, Michael; Moon, Connor; Bolaños-Guzmán, Carlos A.; Steiner, Heinz (2024). "Vilazodone, a Selective Serotonin Reuptake Inhibitor with Diminished Impact on Methylphenidate-Induced Gene Regulation in the Striatum: Role of 5-HT1A Receptor". Molecular Neurobiology. 61 (4): 1907–1919. doi:10.1007/s12035-023-03688-y. ISSN 0893-7648. PMC 10978284. PMID 37807008.

== See also ==
- Basal ganglia disease
