= Basal ganglia disease =

Group of physical problems resulting from basal ganglia dysfunction

- Basal ganglia and related structures
- Specialty: Neurology
- Types: 8

Basal ganglia disease is a group of physical problems that occur when the group of nuclei in the brain known as the basal ganglia fail to properly suppress unwanted movements or to properly prime upper motor neuron circuits to initiate motor function. Research indicates that increased output of the basal ganglia inhibits thalamocortical projection neurons. Proper activation or deactivation of these neurons is an integral component for proper movement. If something causes too much basal ganglia output, then the ventral anterior (VA) and ventral lateral (VL) thalamocortical projection neurons become too inhibited, and one cannot initiate voluntary movement. These disorders are known as hypokinetic disorders. However, a disorder leading to abnormally low output of the basal ganglia leads to reduced inhibition, and thus excitation, of the thalamocortical projection neurons (VA and VL) which synapse onto the cortex. This situation leads to an inability to suppress unwanted movements. These disorders are known as hyperkinetic disorders.

Reasons for abnormal increases or decreases of basal ganglia output are not yet well understood. One possible factor could be the natural accumulation of iron in the basal ganglia, causing neurodegeneration due to its involvement in toxic, free-radical reactions. Though motor disorders are the most common associated with the basal ganglia, recent research shows that basal ganglia disorders can lead to other dysfunctions such as obsessive–compulsive disorder (OCD), Tourette syndrome and klazomania.

== Basal ganglia circuits ==
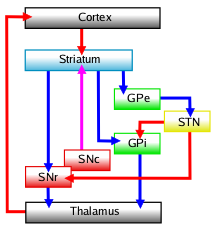
Connectivity diagram showing excitatory glutamatergic pathways as red, inhibitory GABAergic pathways as blue, and modulatory dopaminergic as magenta.

Main circuits of the basal ganglia. Picture shows 2 coronal slices that have been superimposed to include the involved basal ganglia structures. + and - signs at the point of the arrows indicate respectively whether the pathway is excitatory or inhibitory in effect. Green arrows refer to excitatory glutamatergic pathways, red arrows refer to inhibitory GABAergic pathways and turquoise arrows refer to dopaminergic pathways that are excitatory on the direct pathway and inhibitory on the indirect pathway.

The basal ganglia is a collective group of structures in the brain. These include the striatum, (composed of the putamen and caudate nucleus), globus pallidus, substantia nigra, and the subthalamic nucleus. Along with other structures, the basal ganglia are part of a neural circuit that is integral to voluntary motor function. It was once believed that the primary function of the basal ganglia was to integrate projections from the cerebral cortex, and project information via the thalamus to the motor cortex. Research has shown that the basal ganglia can be modeled as a group of components of parallel, re-entrant cortico-subcortical circuits, which originate in cortical areas, traverse the basal ganglia and terminate in specific areas in the frontal lobe. These areas are thought to control not only motor function but also oculomotor, prefrontal, associative, and limbic areas. Understanding these circuits has led to breakthroughs in understanding the disorders of the basal ganglia.

=== Direct pathway ===
Of all the circuits, the motor circuit is the most studied due its importance to motor disorders. The direct pathway of the motor circuit is one in which projections from the cortex travel to the putamen directly to the internal segment of the globus pallidus (GPi also known as GP-Medial) or the substantia nigra, pars reticulata (SNr) and are then directed toward the ventral anterior nucleus (VA), and the ventral lateral nucleus of the thalamus (VL) and brainstem. Through this pathway the basal ganglia is able to initiate voluntary movements by disinhibiting thalamic neurons that drive upper motor neurons. This process is regulated by dopamine secreted by the striatum onto the D_{1} dopamine receptor on the SNc. Dopamine excites striatal neurons in the direct pathway. Proper striatal dopamine release is integral in the suppression of the basal ganglia output, which is needed for increased activity of the thalamic neurons. This activity in thalamic nuclei is an integral component of voluntary movement.

=== Indirect pathway ===
The indirect pathway of the motor circuit is thought to project from the cortex, to the putamen, and to the thalamus and brainstem indirectly by passing through the external segment of the globus pallidus (GPe) then the subthalamic nucleus (STN) before looping back to the internal segment of the globus pallidus (GPi). The indirect pathway is responsible for the termination of movement. The indirect pathway inhibits unwanted movements by simultaneous increase in excitatory input to other GPi and SNr neurons. Similar to the direct pathway, the indirect pathway is regulated by striatal dopamine. D_{2} dopamine receptors inhibit transmission via the indirect pathway. D_{2} receptors inhibit striatal neurons in the indirect, inhibitory pathway. This inhibitory effect of dopamine on the indirect pathway serves the same function as its excitatory effects in the direct pathway in that it reduces basal ganglia output, leading to the disinhibition of motor neurons.

== Associated disorders ==
=== Hypokinetic disorders ===
Hypokinetic disorders are movement disorders that are described as having reduced motor function. This is generally attributed to higher than normal basal ganglia output causing inhibition of thalamocortical motor neurons.

==== Parkinsonism ====
The muscle rigidity, tremor at rest, and slowness in initiation and execution of movement that are the cardinal motor symptoms of Parkinson's disease are attributed to a reduction in dopaminergic activity in the basal ganglia motor areas, particularly the putamen, due to gradually reduced innervation from the pars compacta of substantia nigra. Other motor deficits and common non-motor features of Parkinson's such as autonomic dysfunction, cognitive impairment, and gait/balance difficulties, are thought to result from widespread progressive pathological changes commencing in the lower brain stem and ascending to the midbrain, amygdala, thalamus and ultimately the cerebral cortex.

=== Hyperkinetic disorders ===
Hyperkinetic disorders are movement disorders characterized by increased uncontrollable motor function. They are caused by reduced basal ganglia output, which causes increased thalamocortical function which leads to the inability to stop unwanted movement.

==== Huntington's disease ====
Huntington's disease is a hereditary disease that causes defects in behavior, cognition, and uncontrolled rapid, jerky movements. Huntington's disease stems from a defect that consists of an expanded CAG repeat in the huntingtin gene (HTT) located on the short arm p of chromosome 4. Evidence shows that the basal ganglia in patients with Huntington's disease show a decrease in activity of the mitochondrial pathway, complex II-III. Such deficiencies are often associated with basal ganglia degeneration. This degeneration of striatal neurons projecting to GPe leads to disinhibition of the indirect pathway, increased inhibition of the subthalamic nucleus, and therefore, reduced output of the basal ganglia. The neuronal degeneration eventually causes death within 10 to 20 years.

==== Dystonia ====
Dystonia is a hyperkinetic movement disorder that is characterized by involuntary movement and the slowing of intentional movement. Though there are known causes of dystonia such as metabolic, vascular, and structural abnormalities, there are still patients with dystonia with no apparent cause. Dystonia can occur as a hyperkinetic disorder or as a side effect of hypokinetic disorders such as Parkinson's disease. Until recently it was thought that dystonia was likely caused by extreme lack of function of the direct pathway between the Putamen and the GPi. Again, it was thought that this dysfunction led to a decrease in basal ganglia output to the thalamus and a resultant increased disinhibition of the thalamic projections to the premotor and motor cortex. However recent models in mice show that the dysfunction in the cerebellum may play an equal part in dystonia.

==== Hemiballismus ====
Hemiballismus is a hyperkinetic movement disorder that causes uncontrolled movement on one side of the body. It is generally caused by damage to the subthalamic nucleus (STN). Since the internal segment of the globus pallidus (GPi) is the link in the circuit between the STN and thalamic projection, destruction of localized brain cells in the GPi via a pallidotomy has proven to serve as a useful treatment for hemiballismus.

=== Other basal ganglia diseases ===
The following diseases that generally involve the basal ganglia do not clearly fit into being either hypo- or hyperkinetic.

==== Epilepsy ====
The substantia nigra pars reticulata and its direct input structure, the subthalamic nucleus play a role in seizure propagation circuitry and have been described as seizure gating nuclei. Inhibition of these nuclei suppresses seizures in various experimental epilepsy models. Patients with seizures display some abnormal electrophysiological activity and structural changes like atrophy, altered blood perfusion and metabolism within their basal ganglia. Several case reports describe that deep brain stimulation of the subthalamic nucleus has been successful in reducing seizures. Other targeted treatment approaches have been limited to experimental settings and included local drug infusions and cell transplantation.

==== Tourette syndrome/obsessive–compulsive disorder ====
Tourette syndrome is a disorder that is characterized by behavioral and motor tics, OCD and attention deficit hyperactivity disorder (ADHD). For this reason, it is commonly believed that pathologies involving limbic, associative and motor circuits of the basal ganglia are likely. Since the realization that syndromes such as Tourette syndrome and OCD are caused by dysfunction of the non-motor loops of basal ganglia circuits, new treatments for these disorders, based on treatments originally designed to treat movement disorders are being developed.

Other regions of the brain including the thalamus and frontal cortex also contribute to Tourettes syndrome. Specifically dopamine, is thought to be central to the pathophysiology of Tourette syndrome. The basal ganglia are rich in dopamine receptors, and an imbalance in dopamine signaling can be correlated with the onset and severity of tics.

There are two forms of treatments: medication and therapy. The recommended form of therapy is Comprehensive behavioral intervention for tics. This is a form of  behavioral therapy, which will help the patient with their tics and make them more voluntary. During this process they train individuals how to be more aware of their tics. And encourage changes in their day-to-day activities to help reduce tics. In addition to this, there are various forms of medications that can help make tics more manageable for everyday life. Medications like neuroleptics, benzamides, or atypical antipsychotics are used to decrease dopamine have been effective for the disorder. Deep brain stimulation is another solution to make tics more manageable. There is not a cure for the disorder, but the things mentioned help make tics and outbursts more manageable for an average person to live their daily life. 

The key role of dopamine and Tourettes - Increasing evidence supports the TS hypothesis, particularly regarding the dopamine receptor system.; demonstrated receptor derangement or hyposensitivity in the basal ganglia dopamine pathways plays a critical role in the diathesis for Tourette syndrome. According to most theories, Tourette's syndrome is due to a chemical dysfunction of dopamine in those areas of the brain that are linked to movement control, resulting in the repetitive and uncontrolled tics seen in the syndrome (D2-like Dopamine Receptor Density in Tourette Syndrome Measured by PET, 1997). A few medical researches indicate that people with Tourette syndrome may have an increased dopamine activity level for some reason connected to either greater dopamine receptor sensitivity or irregular dopamine turnover patterns. The basal ganglia, a cerebral structure involved in controlling movement, is believed to be one of the sites vulnerable to dopamine abnormalities and is implicated in the pathogenesis of TS. It is thought that dopamine, norepinephrine, and serotonin neurotransmitters are not able to exchange messages properly between nerve cells in a person diagnosed with Tourette's.

==== Sydenham's chorea ====
Sydenham's chorea is a disorder characterized by rapid, uncoordinated jerking movements primarily affecting the face, hands and feet. It is a result of an autoimmune response that occurs following infection by group A β-hemolytic streptococci (GABHS) that destroys cells in the corpus striatum of the basal ganglia.

==== PANDAS ====
PANDAS is a controversial hypothesis that there exists a subset of children with rapid onset of obsessive–compulsive disorder (OCD) or tic disorders and that these symptoms are caused by group A β-hemolytic streptococcal (GABHS) infections. The proposed link between infection and these disorders is that an initial autoimmune reaction to a GABHS infection produces antibodies that interfere with basal ganglia function, causing symptom exacerbations. It has been proposed that this autoimmune response can result in a broad range of neuropsychiatric symptoms.

==== Dyskinetic cerebral palsy ====
Dyskinetic cerebral palsy is a type of cerebral palsy primarily associated with damage to the basal ganglia in the form of lesions that occur during brain development due to bilirubin encephalopathy and hypoxic-ischemic brain injury. Symptoms include slow, uncontrolled movements of the extremities and trunk and small, rapid, random and repetitive, uncontrolled movements known as chorea. Involuntary movements often increase during periods of emotional stress or excitement and disappear when the patient is sleeping or distracted.

==== Athymhormic syndrome ====
Athymhormic syndrome is a rare psychopathological and neurological syndrome characterized by extreme passivity, apathy, blunted affect, and a profound generalized loss of self-motivation. The syndrome is believed to be due to damage to areas of the basal ganglia or frontal cortex, specifically the striatum and globus pallidus, responsible for motivation and executive functions.

==== Lesch–Nyhan syndrome ====
Lesch–Nyhan syndrome is a rare X-linked recessive disorder caused by a deficiency of the enzyme hypoxanthine-guanine phosphoribosyltransferase (HGPRT), leading to uric acid build-up and a deficiency in dopamine production. Within the first few years of life, extrapyramidal involvement causes abnormal involuntary muscle contractions such as loss of motor control (dystonia), writhing motions (choreoathetosis) and arching of the spine (opisthotonus). The resemblance to dyskinetic cerebral palsy is apparent, and as a result most individuals are initially diagnosed as having cerebral palsy. Psychological behaviours can include rejecting desired treats or travel, repaying kindness with coldness or rage, failing to answer test questions correctly despite study and a desire to succeed or provoking anger from caregivers when affection is desired.

==== Wilson's disease ====
Wilson's disease is an autosomal recessive genetic disorder caused by a mutation in the copper-transport gene ATP7B, leading to excess copper build-up. About half of those affected have neurological symptoms, including parkinsonism (most commonly cogwheel rigidity, bradykinesia or slowed movements and a lack of balance) with or without a typical hand tremor, masked facial expressions, slurred speech, ataxia or dystonia.

==== Fahr's disease and calcifications ====
Fahr's disease is a rare, genetically dominant, inherited neurological disorder characterized by abnormal deposits of calcium, primarily in the basal ganglia. About 0.3–1.5% of people have asymptomatic basal ganglia calcifications.

==== Blepharospasm ====
Blepharospasm is any abnormal contraction or twitch of the eyelid. Blepharospasm may come from abnormal functioning of the brain's basal ganglia.

== Research ==
=== Gene therapy ===
Many disorders of the basal ganglia are due to the dysfunction of a localized area. For this reason, gene therapy seems viable for neurodegenerative disorders. Gene therapy is performed by replacing diseased phenotypes with new genetic material. This process is still in the early stages but early results are promising. An example of this therapy might involve implanting cells genetically modified to express tyrosine hydroxylase which, in the body, could be converted to dopamine. Increasing dopamine levels in the basal ganglia could possibly offset the effects of the Parkinson's Disease.

=== Ablation ===
Lesioning is the intentional destruction of neuronal cells in a particular area used for therapeutic purposes. Though this seems dangerous, vast improvements have been achieved in patients with movement disorders. The exact process generally involves unilateral lesioning in the sensorimotor territory of the GPi. This process is called pallidotomy. It is believed that the success of pallidotomies in reducing the effects of movement disorders may result from the interruption of abnormal neuronal activity in the GPi. This ablation technique can be viewed as simply removing a faulty piece of a circuit. With the damaged piece of the circuit removed, the healthy area of the circuit can continue normal function.

=== Deep brain stimulation ===
Deep brain stimulation involves inserting, via stereotaxic surgery, electrodes into the sensorimotor area of the brain. These electrodes emit high-frequency stimulation to the implanted areas. Bilateral implantation is necessary for symmetric results as well as the ability to reduce the intensity and duration of off-periods as well increase the duration of on-periods. The most effective structures used for implantations for deep brain stimulation are the internal globus pallidus (GPi) and the subthalamic nucleus (STN). This is because it is safer and more effective to alter the influence of the basal ganglia on the thalamocortical nuclei than directly altering neural activity in upper motor neuron circuits. Deep brain stimulation is a more complicated process than other therapies such as ablation. Evidence suggests that benefits of STN deep brain stimulation is due to the activation of efferents and the modulation of discharge patterns in the GPi that are propagated throughout the thalamocortical pathways. The ability to adjust stimulation protocols lends this treatment to a variety of disorders due its ability to alter the activity of basal ganglia circuits.

== See also ==
- Dyskinetic cerebral palsy

== Sources ==
- Purves, Dale; Augustine, George; Fitzpatrick, David; Hall, William C.; LaMantia, Anthony; Mooney, Richard; White, Leonard E., eds. (2018). Neuroscience. Sinauer. ISBN 978-1-60535-380-7.
