= Athetosis =

Condition of uncontrolled writhing movements

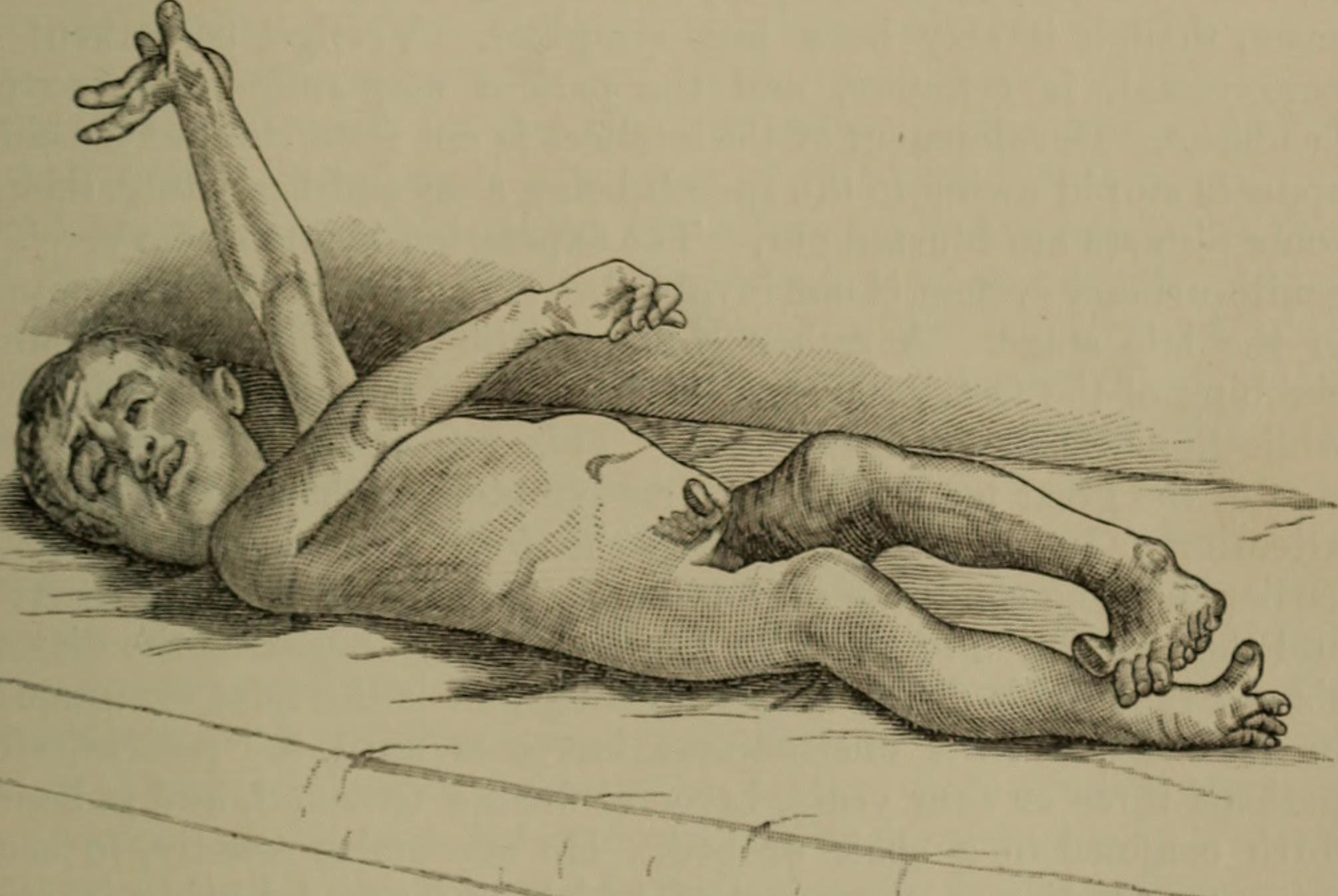
- Bilateral athetosis
- Specialty: Neurology

Athetosis is a symptom characterized by slow, involuntary, convoluted, writhing movements of the fingers, hands, toes, and feet and in some cases, arms, legs, neck and tongue. Movements typical of athetosis are sometimes called athetoid movements. Lesions to the brain are most often the direct cause of the symptoms, particularly to the corpus striatum. This symptom does not occur alone and is often accompanied by the symptoms of cerebral palsy, as it is often a result of this physical disability. Treatments for athetosis are not very effective, and in most cases are simply aimed at managing the uncontrollable movement, rather than the cause itself.

== Signs and symptoms ==
Athetosis can vary from mild to severe motor dysfunction; it is generally characterized by unbalanced, involuntary movements of muscle and a difficulty maintaining a symmetrical posture. The associated motor dysfunction can be restricted to a part of the body or present throughout the body, depending on the individual and the severity of the symptom. One of the pronounced signs can be observed in the extremities in particular, as the writhing, convoluted movement of the digits. Athetosis can appear as early as 18 months from birth with first signs including difficulty feeding, hypotonia, spasm, and involuntary writhing movements of the hands, feet, and face, which progressively worsen through adolescence and at times of emotional distress. Athetosis is caused by lesions in several brain areas such as the hippocampus and the motor thalamus, as well as the corpus striatum; therefore children during the developmental age could possibly suffer from severe communication deficits such as speech impairment, hearing loss, and failed or delayed acquirement of sitting balance, although most people with athetosis have normal or near-normal intelligence.

== Causes ==
Athetosis is a symptom primarily caused by the marbling, or degeneration of the basal ganglia. This degeneration is most commonly caused by complications at birth or by Huntington's disease, in addition to rare cases in which the damage may also arise later in life due to stroke or trauma. The two complications of particular interest are intranatal asphyxia and neonatal jaundice.

=== Asphyxia ===
Asphyxia directly causes basal ganglia damage due to lack of oxygen and therefore, insufficient nutrient supply. The lesions caused by asphyxia are most prominent on the caudate nucleus and the putamen. However, a less-studied consequence of the resulting hypoxia is its effect on the concentrations of the neurotransmitter dopamine within the synapses of neurons in the basal ganglia. Hypoxia leads to an increase in the extracellular dopamine levels and therefore, an increase in the activity of the dopaminergic neurons. Furthermore, this increase in extracellular concentration is not caused by an increase in the neurotransmitter synthesis, but instead on inhibiting its reuptake back into the neurons and glial cells. Therefore, there is an increased dopaminergic effect as dopamine remains in the synapse at higher concentrations leading to additional post-synaptic response. As a result, the uncontrollable writhing motions witnessed with athetosis deal with the over-activity of synapses within the basal ganglia.

=== Neonatal jaundice ===
Neonatal jaundice is the other chief complication that leads to the basal ganglia damage associated with this condition. Jaundice is caused by hyperbilirubinemia, or abnormally high levels of bilirubin in the blood. Bilirubin is usually bound to albumin immediately and sent to the liver. However, in neonatal jaundice, the concentration of bilirubin overwhelms that of albumin and some of the bilirubin remains unconjugated and can enter the brain through the blood–brain barrier. Normally bilirubin would not be able to diffuse across the blood–brain barrier, but in infants, the barrier is immature and has higher permeability. Bilirubin is toxic as it prevents the phosphorylation of many proteins, including synapsin I which binds vesicles in the presynaptic terminal. Therefore, it directly inhibits the exocytosis of neurotransmitters and severely hinders the synapses it affects. In autopsies of children who suffered from neonatal jaundice, chronic changes of neuronal loss, gliosis and demyelination were observed in the basal ganglia and more specifically within the globus pallidus.

=== Thalamic stroke ===
Another study was done where the onset of athetoid movement followed a thalamic stroke. The thalamus is part of a pathway that is involved with the cortical feedback loop in which signals from the cortex are relayed through the striatum, pallidus and thalamus before making it back to the cortex. The striatum receives excitatory inputs from the cortex and inhibits the pallidum. By doing so it frees the thalamus from pallidal inhibition allowing the thalamus to send excitatory outputs to the cortex. Therefore, the lesions to the thalamus or any other part of this feedback loop can result in movement disorders as they can alter the reactivity of one towards the other. Also, in a case of people with thalamic stroke, a majority suffered severe sensory deficits and ataxia. It is proposed that this loss of proprioception and the ensuing loss of synergic stabilization may also lead to abnormal movements, such as those dealt with in athetosis.

== Treatments ==
There are several different treatment approaches to dealing with athetosis. The most common methods are the use of drugs, surgical intervention, and retraining movements of the afflicted person. It is suggested that training a person to relearn movements can be helpful in select situations. Though, generally, this type of treatment will not work, in certain cases it can be found to be very helpful in treating the symptom of athetosis.

Drugs can also be used in the treatment of athetosis, however their collective effectiveness is not very convincing. There is not a single drug that is a standard among treatment. Many different medicines can be used, including:

- trihexyphenidyl
- benzatropine
- Curare, though not practical due to respiratory paralysis
- Tetrabenazine
- Haloperidol
- Thiopropazate
- Diazepam

Most instances of drug use where the symptoms seem to be lessened tend to be in more mild cases of athetosis.

Treatment by surgical intervention can obviously have the most immediate impact, again however, it is not a cure-all. In patients that have cerebral palsy as the cause of their athetosis, it has been demonstrated that a subthalamotomy tends to help relieve the extent of athetosis in approximately half of patients. Additionally, late 19th and early 20th century surgical accounts state that athetosis can be relieved by the removal of a part of the cerebral motor cortex or by cutting a part of the posterior spinal roots. Patients who undergo surgical treatment to relieve the athetosis often see significant improvement in the control of their limbs and digits. While surgery is often very beneficial in the short term and can produce near immediate results, in the long term it has been seen that its effects are not incredibly long lasting.

== Related disorders ==
=== Choreoathetosis ===
Chorea is another condition which results from damage to the basal ganglia. Similar to athetosis, it results from mutations affecting the pallidum inhibition of the thalamus as well as increased dopaminergic activity at the level of the striatum. Considering the etiology of both disorders are fairly similar, it comes as no surprise that chorea and athetosis can and usually do occur together in a condition called choreoathetosis.

=== Cerebral palsy ===
Athetosis is a commonly occurring symptom in the disease cerebral palsy. Of all people with the disease, between 16% and 25% of them actually exhibit the symptom of athetosis. A component of this is the finding that most often the symptoms that involve athetosis occur as a part of choreoathetosis as opposed to athetosis alone.

It is also noteworthy that the presence of athetosis in cerebral palsy (as well as other conditions) causes a significant increase in a person's basal resting metabolic rate. It has been observed that those who have cerebral palsy with athetosis require approximately 500 more Calories per day than their non-cerebral palsy non-athetoid counterpart.

=== Pseudoathetosis ===
Pseudoathetosis is a movement disorder, very similar to athetosis, in which the symptoms are not differentiable from those of actual athetosis, however the underlying cause is different. While actual athetosis is caused by damage to the brain, specifically in the basal ganglia, pseudoathetosis is caused by the loss of proprioception. The loss in proprioception is caused by damage to the area between the primary somatosensory cortex and the muscle spindles and joint receptors. Additionally, when observing an MRI, it can be seen that in the brain of a pseudoathetoid patient, lesions on the brain are not seen in the basal ganglia, the area that is oftentimes the cause of athetosis.

== Social implications ==
Athetosis is characterized as a symptom that is present in many forms of central nervous system disorders that affect the body movement coordination, such as cerebral palsy. Children may struggle to engage in social communication, since the poor coordination of the tongue and mouth muscles can reduce their speech ability and hinder their social interaction to a greater degree. The caregivers of the affected children are encouraged to closely monitor their nutrition and growth and to provide them with hearing aids in order to relieve their symptoms as well as support their academic plans. A growing number of patients is shown to benefit from communication devices such as shorthand typing programs and computer speech devices, as well as simple picture boards.

Patients living with the disorder into their adulthood often have trouble being involved in daily activities such as eating, walking, dressing, as well as performing everyday tasks. They are consistently faced with challenges that limit their ability to live on their own. They are more reluctant to be involved in social activities and romantic relationships and more likely to develop poor self-esteem and self-image related to their physical limitations as well as cognitive disabilities, though such habitual thinking is shown to decline when they feel they are accepted and supported by their peers. Patients are also inclined to associate themselves with people who tend not to be engaged in physical activities, according to the September 2008 issue of "Journal of Physical Activity and Health".

== History ==
The first noted case of athetosis was discovered by W. A. Hammond and described in his book Diseases of the Nervous System in 1871. Hammond was also the person who created the term "athetosis", Greek for "without position". In his initial description of athetosis, the extent of the uncontrolled movement was limited to the fingers and toes. In association with this, he noted that the patients' calves and forearms were oftentimes flexed and that movements were generally slow. Over the period of time leading into the late 20th century, the definition of athetosis was expanded to include movements of the neck, tongue, face, and even the trunk. Along with the expansion of the symptoms came the recognition that it was a part of many medical conditions, including cerebral palsy and stroke.

== Research directions ==
As athetosis is relatively difficult to treat, efforts are being made to help those with the condition live and perform tasks more effectively and more efficiently. One such example of work that has been recently undertaken is a project to help those affected with athetosis to use a computer with more ease. Software for the control of the computer uses joysticks that perform linear filtering to aid in control.

An additional possible treatment option for those afflicted with the symptom is neurostimulation. Studies have begun, and in cerebral palsy patients affected with dystonia-choreoathetosis, it has been demonstrated that neurostimulation has been an effective treatment in lessening symptoms in patients. There has not been a tremendous amount of experimentation, though, in this as a possible treatment option.

== See also ==
- Chorea
- Dyskinesia
- Dystonia
- Pupillary athetosis
