= Direct pathway =

Neural pathway that executes voluntary movements

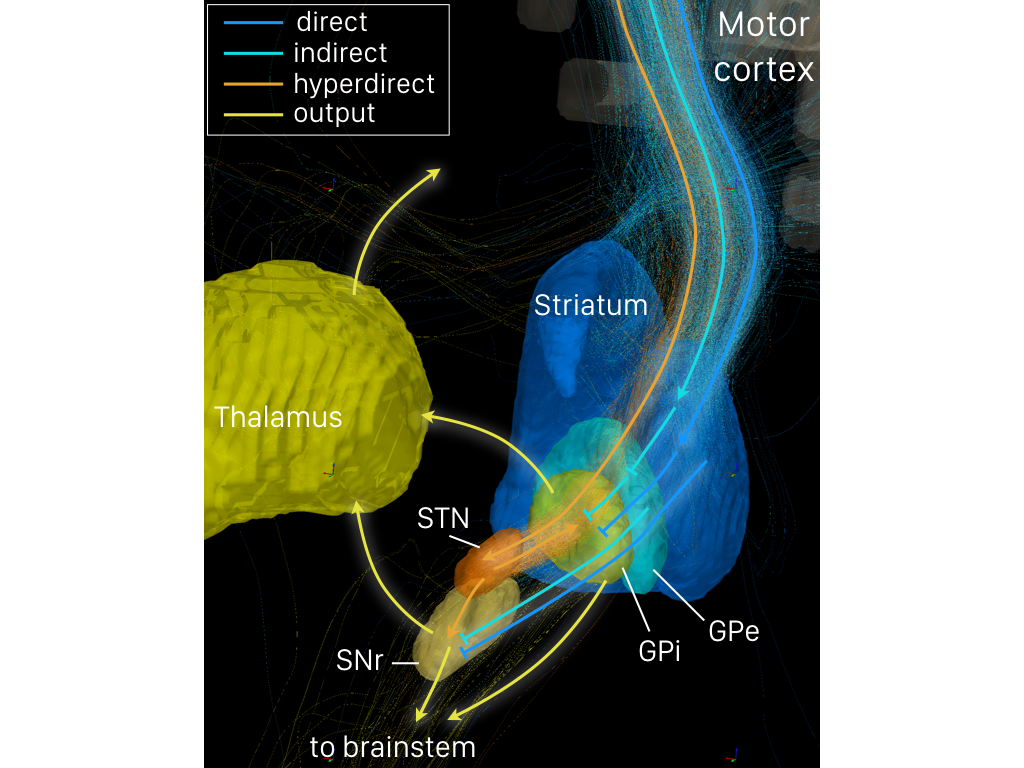
Depicted are parts of the basal ganglia and their interconnections as revealed by diffusion spectrum imaging based on thirty subjects from the human connectome project (HCP MGH). Direct, indirect and hyperdirect pathways are visualized in different colors (see legend). Subcortical structures are rendered based on the Harvard-Oxford subcortical (Thalamus) as well as the Atlasing of the Basal Ganglia atlas (other structures). Rendering was generated using TrackVis software.

The direct pathway, sometimes known as the direct pathway of movement, is a neural pathway within the central nervous system (CNS) through the basal ganglia which facilitates the initiation and execution of voluntary movement. It works in conjunction with the indirect pathway. Both of these pathways are part of the cortico-basal ganglia-thalamo-cortical loop.

== Overview of neuronal connections and normal function ==
The direct pathway passes through the caudate nucleus, putamen, and globus pallidus, which are parts of the basal ganglia. It also involves another basal ganglia component the substantia nigra, a part of the midbrain. In a resting individual, a specific region of the globus pallidus, the internal globus pallidus (GPi), and a part of the substantia nigra, the pars reticulata (SNpr), send spontaneous inhibitory signals to the ventral lateral nucleus (VL) of the thalamus, through the release of GABA, an inhibitory neurotransmitter. Inhibition of the inhibitory neurons that project to the ventral anterior nucleus (VA), which project to the motor regions of the cerebral cortices of the telencephalon, leads to an increase in activity in the motor cortices, thereby promoting muscular action.

When the pre-frontal region of the cerebral cortex, which is generally involved in decision making and planning, determines that a particular motor activity will be executed, it sends activating signals to the motor cortices. The motor cortices send signals through the basal ganglia to refine the choice of muscles that will participate in the movement and to amplify the activity in the motor cortices that will drive the muscle contractions.

In the direct pathway, the motor cortices send activating signals to the caudate and putamen (which together form the dorsal striatum). The cells of the direct pathway in the caudate and putamen that receive these signals are inhibitory and, once they become activated, send inhibitory signals to the GPi and SNpr and stop activity there. Before activation of the direct pathway, these two nuclei were actively sending inhibitory signals to the ventrolateral nucleus of the thalamus, which prevented the development of significant activity in the motor cerebral cortices. This behavior ceases on activation of the direct pathway. The net effect is to allow the activation of the ventral lateral nucleus which, in turn, sends activating signals to the motor cortices. These events amplify motor cortical activity that will eventually drive muscle contractions.

== Diseases involving the direct pathway ==
Interruption or dysfunction of the direct pathway results in hypokinesia, which is, in general terms, a disease which leads to a lack of motion in our body.
