= Dyskinesia =

Category of movement disorders

Dyskinesia is a category of movement disorders that are characterized by involuntary muscle movements, including movements similar to tics or chorea and diminished voluntary movements. Dyskinesia can be anything from a slight tremor of the hands to an uncontrollable movement of the upper body or lower extremities. Discoordination can also occur internally, especially with the respiratory muscles, and it often goes unrecognized. Dyskinesia is a symptom of several medical disorders that are distinguished by their underlying causes.

== Types ==
=== Medication-induced dyskinesias ===
Acute dystonia is a sustained muscle contraction that sometimes appears soon after administration of antipsychotic medications. Any muscle in the body may be affected, including those of the jaw, tongue, throat, arms, and legs. When the throat muscles are involved, this type of dystonia is called an acute laryngospasm and is a medical emergency because it can impair breathing. Older antipsychotics, such as haloperidol or fluphenazine, are more likely to cause acute dystonia than newer agents. Giving high doses of antipsychotics by injection also increases the risk of developing acute dystonia.

Methamphetamine, other amphetamines, and dopaminergic stimulants, including cocaine and pemoline, can produce choreoathetoid dyskinesias; the prevalence, time-frame and prognosis are not well established. Amphetamines also cause a dramatic increase in choreoathetoid symptoms in patients with underlying chorea, such as Sydenham's chorea, Huntington's disease, and lupus. Long-term use of amphetamines may increase the risk of Parkinson's disease (PD): in one retrospective study with over 40,000 participants it was concluded that amphetamine abusers generally had a 200% higher chance of developing PD versus those with no history of abuse; the risk was much higher in women, almost 400%. There remains some controversy as of 2017.

Levodopa-induced dyskinesia (LID) is evident in patients with Parkinson's disease who have been on levodopa (L‑DOPA) for prolonged periods of time. LID commonly first appears in the foot, on the most affected side of the body. There are three main types that can be classified on the basis of their course and clinical presentation following an oral dose of L‑DOPA:

- Off-period dystonia – correlated to the akinesia that occurs before the full effect of L‑DOPA sets in, when the plasma levels of L‑DOPA are low. In general, it occurs as painful spasms in the foot. Patients respond to L‑DOPA therapy.
- Diphasic dyskinesia – occurs when plasma L‑DOPA levels are rising or falling. This form occurs primarily in the lower limbs (though they can happen elsewhere) and is usually dystonic (characterized by apparent rigidity within muscles or groups thereof) or ballistic (characterized by involuntary movement of muscles) and will not respond to L‑DOPA dosage reductions.
- Peak-dose dyskinesia – the most common form of levodopa-induced dyskinesia; it correlates with the plateau L‑DOPA plasma level. This type usually involves the upper limbs more (but could also affect the head, trunk and respiratory muscles), is choreic (of chorea), and less disabling. Patients will respond to L‑DOPA reduction but may be accompanied by deterioration of parkinsonism. Peak-dose L‑DOPA-induced dyskinesia has recently been suggested to be associated with cortical dysregulation of dopamine signaling.

=== Chronic or tardive ===
Late-onset dyskinesia, also known as tardive dyskinesia, occurs after long-term treatment with an antipsychotic drug, such as haloperidol (Haldol) or amoxapine (Asendin). The symptoms include tremors and writhing movements of the body and limbs and abnormal movements in the face, mouth, and tongue – including involuntary lip smacking, repetitive pouting of the lips, and tongue protrusions.

Rabbit syndrome is another type of chronic dyskinesia, while orofacial dyskinesia may be related to persistent replication of herpes simplex virus type 1.

=== Non-motor ===
Two other types, primary ciliary dyskinesia and biliary dyskinesia, are caused by specific kinds of ineffective movement of the body, and are not movement disorders.

== Treatment ==
Antidyskinetic drugs can be used to treat dyskinesia. Certain anticonvulsants can be used as antidyskinetic agents, among drugs acting at other targets. Amantadine is approved for treatment of levodopa-induced dyskinesia. Dopamine-depleting agents like tetrabenazine, deutetrabenazine, and valbenazine are used to treat tardive dyskinesia.

== See also ==
- Akathisia
- Akinesia
- Dopamine
- Hemiballismus
- Medication management of Parkinson's disease
- Paroxysmal dyskinesia
- Psychosis
- Schizophrenia
- Serotonin

== Works cited ==
- Healy, David (2008). Psychiatric Drugs Explained. Elsevier Health Sciences. ISBN 978-0-7020-2997-4.
