= Thalamotomy =

Surgical procedure

- Thalamus
- ICD-9-CM: 01.41

Thalamotomy (Greek: θάλαμος, romanized: thalamus, lit. 'chamber'; Greek: τομή, romanized: tomē, lit. 'cut, slice') is a surgical procedure in which a functional lesion is made into the thalamus to improve the overall brain function in patients. First introduced in the 1950s, it is primarily effective for tremors such as those associated with Parkinson's disease, where a selected portion of the thalamus is surgically destroyed (ablated). Neurosurgeons use specialized equipment to precisely locate an area of the thalamus, usually choosing to work on only one side (the side opposite that of the worst tremors). Bilateral procedures are poorly tolerated because of increased complications and risk, including vision and speech problems. The positive effects on tremors are immediate. Other less destructive procedures are sometimes preferred, such as subthalamic deep brain stimulation, since this procedure can also improve tremors and other symptoms of PD.

== Indications ==
Thalamotomy is a complex procedure performed by specialist neurosurgeons. It is mostly indicated in cases of stroke, damage to third ventricle of brain, brain hemorrhage, accidents leading to head injury, oedema around thalamus, subdural hemorrhage, and cerebrovascular accident. There is also some evidence in thalamocortical dysrhythmia.

== Subthalamotomy ==
Subthalamotomy is a type of brain surgery in which the subthalamic nucleus is destroyed in attempt to help alleviate movement disorders often associated with Parkinson’s disease (PD). This surgery has been most widely researched at Cuba’s International Center for Neurological Restoration located in Havana. This center has assumed a leading role in developing a surgical procedure that provides significant relief for patients experiencing the slowness of movement, tremor, and muscle rigidity in middle to late stages of PD. Similar to the thalamotomy, this procedure can be repeated on both sides of the brain bilaterally, but is not recommended due to a large increase in the risk of speech and cognitive problems after surgery. The aim of subthalamotomies is to reduce symptoms of PD and the uncontrolled movements that can occur in patients taking the drug levodopa for a long time.

=== Surgical procedures ===
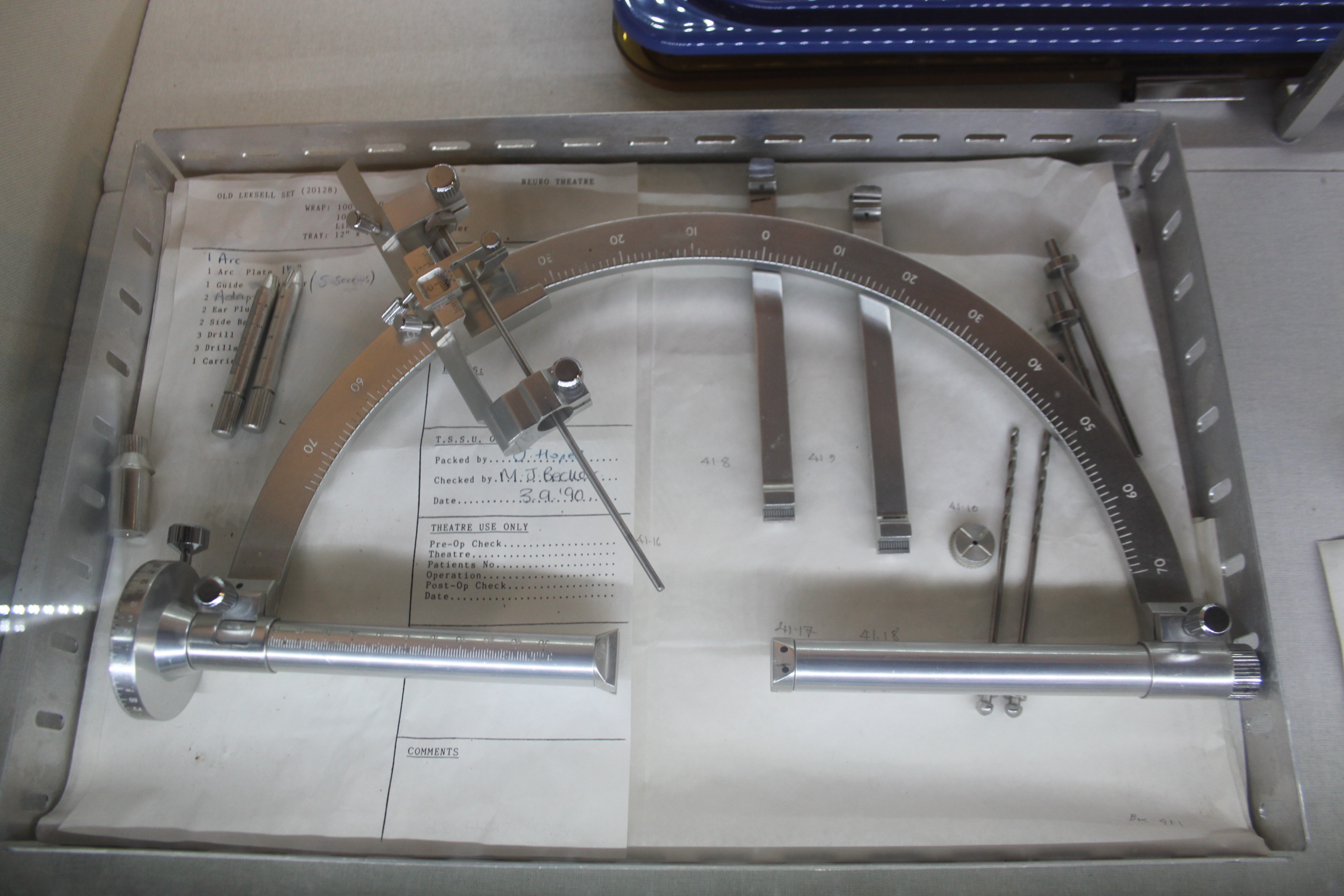
Frame for stereotactic thalamotomy on display at the Glenside Museum

Thalamotomy can be performed in an invasive or noninvasive manner. If performed invasively, then prior to the operation, a neurosurgeon uses stereotactic technology to identify the exact part of the brain that needs treatment by putting in place a frame on the patient’s head with four pins to keep it still. The doctor then takes a detailed brain scan using computed tomography (CT scan) or magnetic resonance imaging (MRI) to identify the precise location for operation, as well as a path through the brain to get to that specific spot. During the surgery, the patient is awake, but the area on the scalp where the surgical tools are inserted is numbed with an anesthetic. The surgeon makes a scalp incision (about 2 inches long), then inserts a hollow probe through a small hole drilled in the skull to the specific location. Different methods can be used to kill the brain cells, including circulating liquid nitrogen inside the probe, destroying the targeted brain tissue, or by inserting an electrode heated to near 200 °F (93 °C) to denature the cells. Although the surgery usually requires only about a two-day hospital stay, full recovery generally takes about six weeks. Thalamotomy can be performed without incisions using ultrasound waves. The ultrasound waves are focused to the thalamus, thus cause thalamotomy through an intact skull. This procedure uses MRI guidance to localize the thalamus. The ultrasound waves cause gradual warming of the tissue until ablation occurs, seen clinically as resolution of tremor. During the procedure, the patient is awake. Thus, if any adverse effects are noted, the area of the thalamus that is treated can be adjusted before ablation. Favorable responses have so far been reported in PD patients and essential tremor patients.

=== Complications ===
Some of the patients in Cuban studies developed complications from the surgery, including severe involuntary movements, but the symptoms abated (to the point where patients could tolerate them) after three to six months. Most common complications include a risk of stroke, confusion, and speech and/or visual problems. Although risks exist with unilateral subthalamotomy, they are greatly increased with bilateral subthalamotomy.

=== Studies ===
One study followed 89 patients with PD who were treated with unilateral subthalamotomy. Sixty-eight patients were available for evaluations after 12 months, 36 after 24 months, and 25 after 36 months. The Unified Parkinson’s Disease Rating Scale motor scores improved significantly and levodopa daily doses were significantly reduced by 45, 36, and 28% at 12, 24 and 36 months after surgery. Unilateral subthalamotomy was associated with significant motor benefit contralateral to the lesion. Further work is needed to ascertain what factors led to severe, persistent chorea-ballism in a subset of patients. In an earlier study, 18 advanced PD patients received staged or simultaneous bilateral one or more subthalamotomy. One patient subsequently developed multiple system atrophy signs and was excluded from further analysis. Motor improvements compared to baseline were 58% in the off state and 63% in the on state. Daily levodopa dose was reduced by a mean of 72%, with five patients receiving none. Three patients developed severe chorea postoperatively, which improved spontaneously at 3–6 months. In a third study, microelectrode mapping (guided stereotactic surgery on the subthalamic nucleus) was performed in eight patients with PD, and the findings indicated that subthalamotomy can ameliorate the cardinal symptoms of PD, reduce the dosage of levodopa, diminish complications of the drug therapy, and improve the quality of life. Havana’s International Center for Neurological Restoration reported at the American Neurological Association meeting in October 2002 that two years after undergoing a bilateral dorsal subthalamotomy, 17 Cuban patients improved by an average of 50% on movement tests, and they could dramatically reduce their daily ingestion of levodopa.

Subthalamotomy could be a preferred option for people with PD who have trouble affording either the medication or deep-brain stimulation needed to moderate symptoms.
