= Choreoathetosis =

Involuntary movements of parts of the body

- Specialty: Neurology

Choreoathetosis is the occurrence of involuntary movements in a combination of chorea (the irregular migrating contractions, where it is defined as choreoathetosis) and athetosis (twisting and writhing). The movements manifest as slow and continuous (such as in the fingers or toes, tongue, or other parts of the body).

It is caused by many different diseases and agents. It is a symptom of several diseases, including GLUT1 deficiency syndrome, Lesch–Nyhan syndrome, phenylketonuria, and Huntington disease and can be a feature of kernicterus (rapidly increasing unconjugated bilirubin that crosses the blood-brain-barrier in infants).

Choreoathetosis is also a common presentation of dyskinesia as a side effect of levodopa-carbidopa in the treatment of Parkinson disease.

The use of crack cocaine or amphetamines can result in conditions nicknamed crack dancing, or tweaking respectively, described as choreoathetoid. Athetosis can arise as a result of toxicity of these drugs and from basal ganglia diseases.

== See also ==
- Hypocalcemia
- Ulegyria
