= Hemiballismus =

Basal ganglia movement disorder

- Other names: Ballismus or Ballism
- Specialty: Neurology

Hemiballismus or hemiballism is a basal ganglia syndrome resulting from damage to the subthalamic nucleus in the basal ganglia. It is a rare hyperkinetic movement disorder, that is characterized by pronounced involuntary limb movements on one side of the body and can cause significant disability. Rarely it affects both sides of the body. Symptoms can decrease during sleep.

Hemiballismus differs from chorea in that the movements occur in the proximal limbs whereas in chorea the limb movements are in the distal limbs. Also in chorea the movements are more dance-like, flowing from one region to another.

== Symptoms ==
Ballism was defined by Meyers in 1968 as "Repetitive, but constantly varying, large amplitude involuntary movements of the proximal parts of the limbs. This activity is almost ceaseless and movements are often complex and combined". Hemiballismus is usually characterized by involuntary flinging motions of the extremities. The movements are often violent and have wide amplitudes of motion. They are continuous and random and can involve proximal or distal muscles on one side of the body. Some cases even include the facial muscles. It is common for arms and legs to move together. The more a patient is active, the more the movements increase. With relaxation comes a decrease in movements. Physicians can measure the severity of the disorder by having the patient perform a series of basic, predetermined tasks and counting the hemiballistic movements during a set time session. The physicians then rate the patient on a severity scale. This scale gives scientists and clinicians a way to compare patients and determine the range of the disorder.

The name hemiballismus literally means "half ballistic", referring to the violent, flailing movements observed on one side of the body.

== Causes ==
In examining the causes of hemiballismus, it is important to remember that this disorder is extremely rare. While hemiballismus can result from the following list, just because a patient has one of these disorders does not mean they will also experience hemiballismus.

=== Stroke ===
Hemisballismus as a result of stroke occurs in only about 0.45 cases per hundred thousand stroke patients. Even at such a small rate, stroke is by far the most common cause of hemiballismus. A stroke causes tissue to die due to a lack of oxygen resulting from an impaired blood supply. In the basal ganglia, this can result in the death of tissue that helps to control movement. As a result, the brain is left with damaged tissue that sends damaged signals to the skeletal muscles in the body. The result is occasionally a patient with hemiballismus.

=== Traumatic brain injury ===
Hemiballismus can also occur as a result of a traumatic brain injury. There are cases in which survivors of assault or other forms of violence have developed hemiballismus. Through these acts of violence, the survivor's brain has been damaged and the hemiballistic movements have developed.

=== Amyotrophic lateral sclerosis ===
This disease causes neuronal loss and gliosis, which can include the subthalamic nucleus and other areas of the brain. Essentially any disorder that causes some form of neuronal loss or gliosis in the basal ganglia has the potential to cause hemiballismus.

Hyperglycemia-induced involuntary movements (in this case, not hemiballismus, but hemichorea (chorea of one side of the body) and bilateral dystonia) in a 62-year-old Japanese woman with type 1 diabetes.

=== Nonketotic hyperglycemia ===
Patients with nonketotic hyperglycemia can develop hemiballismus as a complication to the disease through the development of a subthalamic nucleus lesion. This is the second most common reported cause of hemiballismus. It can be found primarily in the elderly and many of the reported cases have come from East Asian origin, which suggests that there may be some genetic disposition to development of hemiballismus as a result of hyperglycemia. Hemiballistic movements appear when blood glucose levels get too high and then subside once glucose levels return to normal. This time scale for this is usually several hours. In patients with this type of hemiballismus, imaging reveals abnormalities in the putamen contralateral to the movements as well as the globus pallidus and caudate nucleus. While the hyperglycemia itself is not the cause of the hemiballistic movements, it has been suggested that petechial hemorrhage or a decreased production of GABA and acetylcholine could result secondary to the hyperglycemia. One of these issues could be responsible for the hemiballistic movements.

=== Neoplasms ===
A neoplasm is an abnormal growth of cells. Cases have shown that if this occurs somewhere in the basal ganglia, hemiballismus can result.

=== Vascular malformations ===
Vascular malformations can cause abnormal blood flow to areas of the brain. If too little blood is delivered to the basal ganglia, a stroke can occur.

=== Tuberculomas ===
This is another form of tumor that can result in the brain as a result of a tuberculous meningitis infection. This type of tumor can also damage parts of the basal ganglia, sometimes resulting in hemiballismus.

=== Demyelinating plaques ===
Demyelinating plaques attack the myelin sheaths on neurons. This decreases the conduction velocity of the neurons, making the signals received by the basal ganglia garbled and incomplete. This disorganized signal can also cause the chaotic movements characterized by hemiballismus.

=== Complications from HIV infection ===
Patients with HIV often have complications that arise along with AIDS. Hypoglycemia due to pentamidine use in patients with AIDS has been known to cause hemiballismus. In some patients, hemiballismus has been the only visible symptom to alert the physician that the patients may have AIDS. It is typically a result of a secondary infection that occurs due to the compromised immune system and the most common infection causing hemiballismus is cerebral toxoplasmosis. Most of the lesions that result from this infection are found in the basal ganglia. As long as the diagnosis is not missed, this type of hemiballismus can be treated just as well as in patients without HIV.

== Anatomy ==
=== Basal ganglia ===
The basal ganglia are a collection of nuclei that connects to several other areas of the brain. Due to the diverse nuclei that they contain, the basal ganglia are involved in numerous functions, including motor control. It is within this structure that hemiballismus primarily occurs in the brain.

=== Subthalamic nucleus ===
This structure within the basal ganglia innervates other structures, including a very important connection to the internal globus pallidus. The subthalamic nucleus essentially provides the excitement needed to drive the globus pallidus. Injury to this area or its efferent or afferent connections can induce this disorder contralateral to the side of the lesion. The structure itself is a regulator of motor function and is also involved in associative and limbic functions. It was traditionally thought that the disorder was only caused by injury to the subthalamic nucleus, but later studies have shown that damage to other basal ganglia regions can also be responsible for causing this disorder. Hemiballismus caused by lesions in the subthalamic nucleus is more severe than other forms of the disorder.

=== Globus pallidus ===
From recent studies, it is now thought that hemiballismus can be associated with a decreased output of the globus pallidus. This is because studies have shown that firing rates decrease from 70/s to 40/s. In addition to a decreased firing rate, degenerative neurological disorders that cause patients to exhibit hemiballistic movements show a marked decrease in the globus pallidus mass as well. Increases in activity in this area causes there to be an inhibition of the motor thalamus. This causes cortical activation and thus a movement inhibition. In the case of hemiballismus, the opposite occurs, leading to the characteristic large, irregular movements.

=== Putamen ===
The putamen is also part of the basal ganglia and can be involved in hemiballismus due to the fact that it projects to the premotor cortex through the globus pallidus. As a result, damage to this area can also cause hemiballistic movements to be seen as it is also part of the chain in movement.

=== Caudate nucleus ===
The caudate nucleus is the portion of the basal ganglia that helps control voluntary movement. Damage to this area can also result in hemiballismus as it is directly related to voluntary movement.

=== Cortical structures ===
While the majority of damage that causes hemiballismus occurs within the basal ganglia, there are still cases that have been documented on which damage to cortical structures has caused hemiballistic movements.

== Diagnosis ==
Diagnosis of hemiballismus is a clinical one, made with observation during clinical examination. Hemiballismus is a clinical sign with a number of different causes. Therefore, a diagnosis underlying this clinical sign should be sought. The observer should note sudden, flinging movements of a limb(s) and occasionally the face. This is commonly unilateral ("Hemiballismus"). The movements must be distinguished from other hyperkinetic movement disorders such as tremor (generally more rhythmic, and smaller amplitude) and chorea, akathisia and athetosis (all are often of lower amplitude and less violent).

== Treatments ==
When treating hemiballismus, it is first important to treat whatever may be causing the manifestation of this disorder. This could be hyperglycemia, infections, or neoplastic lesions. Some patients may not even need treatment because the disorder is not severe and can be self-limited.

=== Dopamine blockers ===
When pharmacological treatment is necessary, the most standard type of drug to use is an antidopaminergic drug. Blocking dopamine is effective in about ninety percent of patients. Perphenazine, pimozide, haloperidol, and chlorpromazine are standard choices for treatment. Scientists are still unsure as to why this form of treatment works, as dopamine has not been directly linked to hemiballismus.

=== Anticonvulsants ===
An anticonvulsant called topiramate has helped patients in three cases and may be a viable treatment for the future.

=== ITB therapy ===
Intrathecal baclofen (ITB) therapy is used to treat a variety of movement disorders such as cerebral palsy and multiple sclerosis. It can also be a possibility to help treat hemiballismus. In one case, before ITB the patient had an average of 10–12 ballism episodes of the right lower limb per hour. During episodes, the right hip would flex up to about 90 degrees, with a fully extended knee. After an ITB pump was implanted and the correct dosage was found, the frequency of ballistic right leg movements decreased to about three per day, and the right hip flexed to only 30 degrees. The patient was also able to better isolate individual distal joint movements in the right lower limb. The patient currently receives 202.4 microg/day of ITB and continues to benefit almost 6 years after the ITB pump was implanted.

=== Botulinum injections ===
New uses for botulinum toxin have included treatment of hemiballismus. However, this is still in the early stages of testing. This treatment deals with the muscular manifestations of hemiballismus as opposed to the neurological causes.

=== Tetrabenazine ===
Tetrabenazine has been used to treat other movement disorders, but is now being used to treat hemiballismus. Patients using this medication have had a dramatic response. However, lowering the dosage leads to a return of symptoms. This drug works by depleting dopamine.

=== Antipsychotics ===
In one case, a patient had not been responding to haloperidol, thus the physician tried olanzapine. The patient made a significant recovery. More research is being performed on the use of these types of drugs in treating hemiballismus.

=== Functional neurosurgery ===
Surgery as a treatment should only be used on patients with severe hemiballismus that has not responded to treatment. Lesioning of the globus pallidus or deep brain stimulation of the globus pallidus are procedures that can be used on humans. Usually, lesioning is favored over deep brain stimulation because of the maintenance required to continue stimulating the brain correctly and effectively.

== Prognosis ==
In the past, the prognosis for patients with this disease had been very poor; with many patients experiencing severe disability or death. Now, patients are responding remarkably well to current treatments and the majority of patients go into spontaneous remission. For those that do not go into remission, the symptoms of hemiballismus can generally be very well controlled with medication. Due to the rarity of this disorder, scientists know very little about the details of hemiballismus.

- There appears to be a discrepancy between this disorder in humans and animals that has yet to be explained.
- Hemiballismus can also be induced by damage to other areas of the basal ganglia besides the subthalamic nucleus. Research is being done in these areas in order to give scientists and clinicians a better model for this disease that will ultimately lead to better diagnosis and treatment of this disorder.
- Research is also being done on why certain treatments seem to help hemiballistic patients when they should seemingly do more harm. An example of this is why lesioning the globus pallidus seems to reduce hemiballistic movements.
- The mechanism behind the effect of dopamine on patients' symptoms remains unknown.

== History ==
The work of J.R. Whittier, F.A. Mettler, and M.B. Carpenter in the mid-1900s helped scientists and clinicians form a more complete picture of hemiballismus. In their experiments, several lesions were made in the basal ganglia structures in monkeys and then they monitored the results. They noticed that the majority of the time, the monkeys did not have any unusual movements. However, when at least twenty percent of the subthalamic nucleus was damaged, abnormal movements were seen in the limbs opposite to the side of the brain that was damaged. This observation caused scientists to believe that hemiballismus outside the subthalamic nucleus did not occur. It was not until much later that this classical model began to expand to include other areas of the basal ganglia and even some cortical structures. They also noticed that unlike human patients, the unusual movements in the monkeys were mainly in the lower extremities. In about half of the monkeys, the hemiballismus continued until the monkey died.

Other scientists have also worked on this perplexing disorder and have found that the symptoms can be induced by injecting kainic acid or ibotenic acid into the subthalamic nucleus. I. Hamada and M.R. DeLong found that by using these chemicals, they could destroy only four percent of the subthalamic nucleus and still see hemiballistic movements. However, the abnormal movements would usually disappear within four to five hours even though it did not appear as though the damaged tissue had healed. This suggests that the subthalamic nucleus is plastic enough to adapt to small amounts of damage in order to resume normal function.

== See also ==
- Movement disorders
