= Hypokinesia =

Decreased movement due to basal ganglia dysfunction

- A person with medication-induced dystonia, which is a byproduct of hypokinesia
- Specialty: Neurology
- Differential diagnosis: Dystonia

Hypokinesia is one of the classifications of movement disorders, and refers to decreased bodily movement. Hypokinesia is characterized by a partial or complete loss of muscle movement due to a disruption in the basal ganglia. Hypokinesia is a symptom of Parkinson's disease shown as muscle rigidity and an inability to produce movement. It is also associated with mental health disorders and prolonged inactivity due to illness, amongst other diseases.

The other category of movement disorder is hyperkinesia that features an exaggeration of unwanted movement, such as twitching or writhing in Huntington's disease or Tourette syndrome.

== Spectrum of disorders ==
Hypokinesia describes a variety of more specific disorders:

Hypokinetic disorder	Characteristics
Akinesia (α- a-, "without", κίνησις kinēsis, "motion")	Inability to initiate voluntary movement.
Bradykinesia (βραδύς bradys, "slow", κίνησις kinēsis, "motion")	Slowness of initiation of voluntary movement with a progressive reduction in speed and range of repetitive actions, such as voluntary finger-tapping. It occurs in Parkinson's disease and other disorders of the basal ganglia. It is one of the four key symptoms of parkinsonism, which are bradykinesia, tremor, rigidity, and postural instability.
Dysarthria	A condition which affects the muscles necessary for speech, it causes difficulty in speech production despite a continued cognitive understanding of language. Often caused by Parkinson's disease, patients experience weakness, paralysis, or lack of coordination in the motor-speech system, causing respiration, phonation, prosody, and articulation to be affected. Problems including tone, speed of communication, breath control, volume, and timing are displayed. Hypokinetic dysarthria particularly affects the volume of speech, prompting treatment with a speech language pathologist.
Dyskinesia	This is characterized by a diminished ability for voluntary movements, as well as the presence of involuntary movements. The hands and upper body are the areas most likely to be affected by tremors and tics. In some cases, Parkinson's patients experience dyskinesia as a negative side effect of dopamine medications.
Dystonia	A movement disorder characterised by sustained muscle contractions, frequently causing twisted and repetitive movements, or abnormal postures.
Freezing	This is characterized by an inability to move muscles in any desired direction.
Neuroleptic malignant syndrome	Resulting from heavy exposure to drugs that block dopamine receptors, victims can experience fever, rigidity, mental status change, dysautonomia, tremors, dystonia, and myoclonus. While this disorder is extremely rare, immediate attention is necessary because of the high risk of death.
Rigidity	Resistance to externally imposed ("passive") joint movements, such as when a doctor flexes a patient's arm at the elbow joint. It does not depend on imposed speed and can be elicited at very low speeds of passive movement in both directions. Cogwheel rigidity and lead pipe rigidity are two types identified with Parkinson's disease: Lead pipe rigidity is sustained resistance to passive movement throughout the whole range of motion, with no fluctuations.; Cogwheel rigidity is jerky resistance to passive movement as muscles tense and relax.; Spasticity, a special form of rigidity, is present only at the start of passive movement. It is rate-dependent and only elicited upon a high-speed movement. These various forms of rigidity can be seen in different forms of movement disorders, such as Parkinson's disease.
Postural instability	A disturbance in balance that impairs the ability to maintain an upright posture when standing and walking. In Parkinsons disease it is correlated with greater disability and more depression, as well as with frequency of falls and fear of falls (which, itself, can be significantly disabling).

== Causes ==
The most common cause of hypokinesia is Parkinson's disease, and conditions related to Parkinson's disease.

Other conditions may also cause slowness of movements. These include hypothyroidism and severe depression. These conditions need to be ruled out before a diagnosis of Parkinsonism is made.

== Pathophysiology ==
=== Associated neurotransmitters ===
Dopamine

The main neurotransmitter thought to be involved in hypokinesia is dopamine. Essential to the basal ganglionic-thalamocortical loop, which processes motor function, dopamine depletion is common in these areas of hypokinesic patients. Bradykinesia is correlated with lateralized dopaminergic depletion in the substantia nigra. The dopamine pathway in the substantia nigra is essential to motor function, and commonly a lesion in this area correlates with displayed hypokinesia. Tremor and rigidity, however, seem to be only partially due to dopamine deficits in the substantia nigra, suggesting other processes are involved in motor control. Treatments for hypokinesia often either attempt to prevent dopamine degradation by MAO-B or increase the amount of neurotransmitter present in the system.

GABA and glutamate

The inhibitory neurotransmitter GABA and the excitatory glutamate are found in many parts of the central nervous system, including in the motor pathways that involve hypokinesia. In one pathway, glutamate in the substantia nigra excites the release of GABA into the thalamus, which then inhibits the release of glutamate in the cortex and thereby reduces motor activity. If too much glutamate is initially in the substantia nigra, then through interaction with GABA in the thalamus and glutamate in the cortex, movements will be reduced or will not occur at all.

Another direct pathway from the basal ganglia sends GABA inhibitory messages to the globus pallidus and substantia nigra, which then send GABA to the thalamus. In the indirect pathway, the basal ganglia send GABA to the globus pallidus which then sends it to the subthalamic nucleus, which then disinhibited sends glutamate to the output structures of the basal ganglia. Inhibition of GABA release could disrupt the feedback loop to the basal ganglia and produce hypokinesic movements.

GABA and glutamate often interact with each other and with dopamine directly. In the basal ganglia, the nigrostriatal pathway is where GABA and dopamine are housed in the same neurons and released together.

=== Neurobiology ===
Hypokinetic symptoms arise from damage to the basal ganglia, which plays a role in producing force and computing the effort necessary to make a movement. Two possible neural pathways enable the basal ganglia to produce movement. When activated, the direct pathway sends sensory and motor information from the cerebral cortex to the first structure of the basal ganglia, the putamen. That information directly inhibits the globus pallidus internal and allows free movement. The indirect pathway, traveling through the putamen, globus pallidus external, and subthalamic nucleus, activates the globus pallidus internal threshold and inhibits the thalamus from communicating with the motor cortex, producing hypokinetic symptoms.

Basal ganglia (red) and related structures (blue)

When levels of dopamine decrease, the normal wave-firing pattern of basal ganglia neural oscillations changes and the tendency for oscillations increases, particularly in the beta wave of the basal ganglia. Recent research indicates, when oscillations fire simultaneously, processing is disrupted at the thalamus and cortex, affecting activities such as motor planning and sequence learning, as well as causing hypokinetic tremors.

== Treatments ==
=== Dopaminergic drugs ===
Dopaminergic drugs are commonly used in the early stages of the hypokinesia to treat patients. With increased intake, though, they can become ineffective because of the development of noradrenergic lesions. While initially the dopaminergic drugs may be effective, these noradrenergic lesions are associated with hypokinesic gait disorder development later on.

Some Parkinson's patients are unable to move during sleep, prompting the diagnosis of "nocturnal hypokinesia". Physicians have experienced success treating this sleep disorder with slow-release or night-time dopaminergic drugs, and in some cases, continuous stimulation by the dopamine agonist rotigotine. Despite improved mobility during sleep, many Parkinson's patients report an extremely uncomfortable sleeping experience even after dopaminergic treatments.

=== Deep brain stimulation ===
Once the reaction to dopaminergic drugs begins to fluctuate in Parkinson's patients, deep brain stimulation (DBS) of the subthalamic nucleus and internal globus pallidus is often used to treat hypokinesia. DBS, like dopaminergic drugs, initially provides relief, but chronic use causes worse hypokinesia and freezing of gait. Lower-frequency DBS in irregular patterns has been shown to be more effective and less detrimental in treatment.

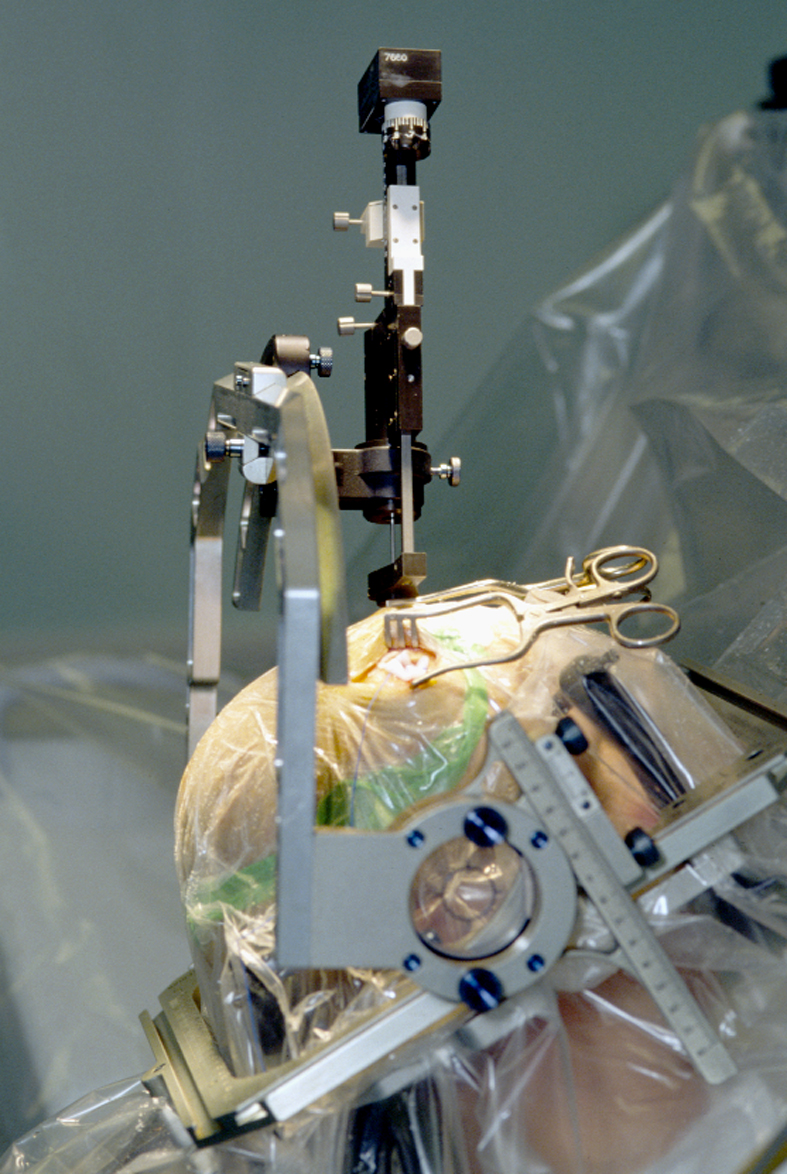
Parkinson surgery

Posteroventral pallidotomy (PVP) is a specific kind of DBS that destroys a small part of the globus pallidus by scarring the neural tissue, reducing brain activity and therefore tremors and rigidity. PVP is suspected to recalibrate basal ganglia activity in the thalamocortical pathway. PVP in the dominant hemisphere has been reported to disrupt executive function verbal processing abilities, and bilateral PVP may disturb processes of focused attention.

Many akinesia patients also form a linguistic akinesia in which their ability to produce verbal movements mirrors their physical akinesia symptoms, especially after unsuccessful PVP. Patients are usually able to maintain normal levels of fluency, but often stop midsentence, unable to remember or produce a desired word. According to a study of Parkinson's patients with articulatory hypokinesia, subjects with faster rates of speech experienced more problems trying to produce conversational language than those who normally spoke at slower rates.

=== Methylphenidate ===
Methylphenidate, commonly used to treat ADHD, has been used in conjunction with levodopa to treat hypokinesia in the short term. The two work together to increase dopamine levels in the striatum and prefrontal cortex. Methylphenidate mainly inhibits dopamine and noradrenaline reuptake by blocking presynaptic transporters, and levodopa increases the amount of dopamine, generally improving hypokinesic gait. Some patients, however, have adverse reactions of nausea and headache to the treatment and the long-term effects of the drug treatment still need to be assessed.

=== Stem cells ===
New treatments include increasing the number of dopamine cells by transplanting stem cells into the basal ganglia or stimulating endogenous stem cell production and movement to the basal ganglia. The successful integration of stem cells can relieve hypokinetic symptoms and decrease the necessary dose of dopaminergic drugs. However, a variety of complications, including possible tumor formation, inappropriate cell migration, rejection of cells by the immune system, and cerebral hemorrhage are possible, causing many physicians to believe the risks outweigh the possible benefits.

=== NOP receptor antagonists ===
Another treatment, still in an experimental stage, is the administration of nociception FQ peptide (NOP) receptor antagonists. This treatment has been shown to reduce hypokinesia in animal studies when increasing nociception FQ in the substantia nigra and subthalamic nucleus. Low doses can be taken with dopaminergic treatment to decrease the amount of L-dopa needed, which can reduce its long-term side effects and improve motor performance.

=== Dance therapy ===
Dance therapy has also been shown to reduce hypokinesic movements and rigidity, though targeted more at the muscular aspects of the disorder than the neural activity.

== Associations ==
=== Cognitive impairment ===
Bradykinesia has been shown to precede impairment of executive functions, working memory, and attention. These cognitive deficiencies can be tied to nonfunction of the basal ganglia and prefrontal cortex, which is also linked to the motor-dysfunction of hypokinesia. Tremor and rigidity have not had observable connections to cognitive impairments, supporting the idea that they are not as involved in the dopamine pathway in the basal ganglionic-thalamocortical loop. Dopaminergic treatments have shown improvement in cognitive functions associated with hypokinesia, suggesting they are also dependent on dopamine levels in the system.

=== Motor motivation ===
Often debated is whether the efficiency, vigor, and speed of movements in patients with hypokinesia are tied to motivation for rewarding and against punishing stimuli. The basal ganglia have been tied to the incentives behind movement, therefore suggesting a cost/benefit analysis of planned movement could be affected in hypokinesia. Rewards have not been shown to change the aspects of a hypokinesic individual's movement. In fact, the motor planning and control of a patient with hypokinesia is already as efficient as possible (as shown by slightly faster, but generally the same movement after deep brain stimulation of the subthalamic nucleus). This suggests that hypokinetic individuals simply have a narrower range of movement that does not increase relative to motivation.

Other studies have come to the same conclusion about rewards and hypokinesia, but have shown that aversive stimuli can, in fact, reduce hypokinesic movement. Dopamine is either less involved or has a more complex role in the response to punishment than it does to rewards, as the hypodopaminergic striatum allows more movement in response to aversive stimuli.

=== Demographic differentiation ===
Gender

More men than women typically develop hypokinesia, which is reflected in young and middle-aged populations where females have displayed higher levels of nigrostriatal dopamine than males. In the elderly, however, this differentiation is not present. Typically, women exhibit more tremor in the beginning development of hypokinesia. In the disorder, men tend to display more rigidity and women more bradykinesic motor behavior.

Age of onset

Hypokinesia is displayed in the brain and outwardly slightly different depending on when an individual is first affected. In young-onset hypokinesia (younger than 45 years of age), typically slightly more cell loss occurs in the substantia nigra with more displayed dystonia and muscle stiffness. In old-onset hypokinesia (older than 70 years of age), typically more of a hypokinesic gait and difficulty walking and no dystonia are seen. Both onsets can display resting tremor, although more generally found in old-onset cases.

=== Symptoms ===
Stress causes alterations of cerebral circulation, increasing blood flow in the supramarginal gyrus and angular gyrus of the parietal lobe, the frontal lobe, and the superior temporal gyrus of the left hemisphere. Also, an increase in cardiac activity and change in the tonus of the heart vessels occurs, which is an elementary indication of stress development. In patients with normal stress, an adaptive fight-or-flight response is usually triggered by sympathetic nervous system activation. Hypokinesia patients experience these typical stress symptoms on a regular basis because of damage to the basal ganglia system. Therefore, when a hypokinesia victim is under stress, he or she does not display a typical fight-or-flight response, placing the patient under greater danger from potentially harmful stimuli. Low-impact exercise, elimination of drug and alcohol use, and regular meditation can help to restore normal stress responses in hypokinesia patients.

== Connections to other medical conditions ==
Though it is often most associated with Parkinson's disease, hypokinesia can be present in a wide variety of other conditions.

Condition	Connection to hypokinesia
Stroke	Damage to certain areas of the brain due to lack of oxygenation has been found to cause hypokinetic symptoms. Frontal and subcortical lesions caused by stroke are more likely to cause hypokinesia than posterior lesions.
Schizophrenia	The lack of connections between the right supplementary motor area to the pallidum and the left primary motor cortex to the thalamus shown in patients with schizophrenia is thought to lead to hypokinesia.
Hyperammonemia	Chronic hyperammonemia and liver disease can alter neurotransmission of GABA and glutamate by increasing the amount of glutamate in the substantia nigra and inhibiting movement.
Progressive supranuclear palsy	Very similar to Parkinson's disease, supranuclear palsy does not actually display the hypokinetic characteristic of progressive loss of movement, despite small amplitude. Diagnosis of hypokinesia can help to distinguish this disorder from Parkinson's.

== See also ==
- Akinetic mutism
- Hyperkinesia
