= Medium spiny neuron =

Type of GABAergic neuron in the striatum

Details
- Location: Basal ganglia
- Shape: Spiny neuron
- Function: Inhibitory projection neuron
- Neurotransmitter: GABA
- Presynaptic connections: Dopaminergic: VTA, SNc; Glutamatergic: PFC, hippocampus, amygdala, thalamus, other
- Postsynaptic connections: Other basal ganglia structures

Identifiers
- MeSH: D000094242
- NeuroLex ID: nifext_141

Medium spiny neurons (MSNs), also known as spiny projection neurons (SPNs), are a special type of inhibitory GABAergic neuron representing approximately 90% of neurons within the human striatum, a basal ganglia structure. Medium spiny neurons have two primary phenotypes (characteristic types): D1-type MSNs of the direct pathway and D2-type MSNs of the indirect pathway. Most striatal MSNs contain only D1-type or D2-type dopamine receptors, but a subpopulation of MSNs exhibit both phenotypes.

Direct pathway MSNs excite their ultimate basal ganglia output structure (such as the thalamus) and promote associated behaviors; these neurons express D1-type dopamine receptors, adenosine A1 receptors, dynorphin peptides, and substance P peptides. Indirect pathway MSNs inhibit their output structure and in turn inhibit associated behaviors; these neurons express D2-type dopamine receptors, adenosine A2A receptors (A2A), DRD2–A2A heterotetramers, and enkephalin. Both types express glutamate receptors (NMDAR and AMPAR), cholinergic receptors (M1 and M4) and CB1 receptors are expressed on the somatodendritic area of both MSN types. A subpopulation of MSNs contain both D1-type and D2-type receptors, with approximately 40% of striatal MSNs expressing both DRD1 and DRD2 mRNA. In the nucleus accumbens (NAcc), these mixed-type MSNs that contain both D1-type and D2-type receptors are mostly contained in the NAcc shell.

The dorsal striatal MSNs play a key role in initiating and controlling movements of the body, limbs, and eyes. The ventral striatal MSNs play a key role in motivation, reward, reinforcement, and aversion. Dorsal and ventral medium spiny neuron subtypes (i.e., direct D1-type and indirect D2-type) are identical phenotypes, but their output connections differ.

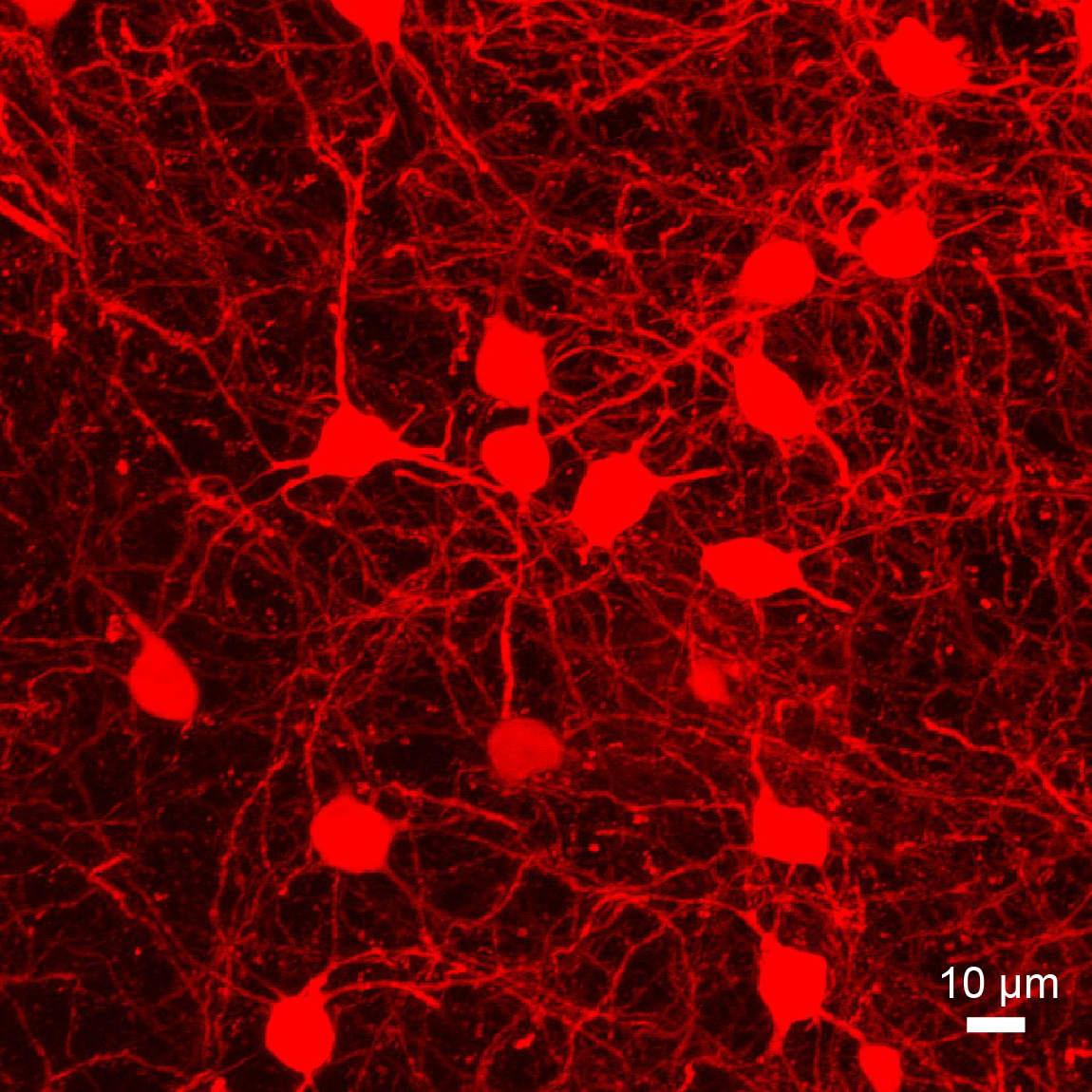
Confocal microscopy Z projection of medium spiny neurons (MSNs) in the mouse striatum. The neurons were labeled using the matrisome MSN mouse Gpr101-Cre in combination with a dtTomato (red fluorescent protein) reporter. A 3D projection of the same neurons can be viewed here.

== Appearance and location ==
The medium spiny neurons are medium-sized projection neurons with extensively branched dendrites. The cell body is 15–18 μm and has five primary dendrites that become branched. At first the dendrites are without spines but at about the first branch point they become densely spined. The branches produce almost spherical dendritic fields of between 200–300 μm.

About 90% of neurons in the striatum are medium projection neurons, the other 10% are interneurons. In the direct pathway the neurons project directly to the globus pallidus internal (GPi) and the substantia nigra pars reticulata (SNpr). In the indirect pathway the MSNs ultimately project to these two structures via an intermediate connection to the globus pallidus external (GPe) and ventral pallidum (VP). The GPe and VP send a GABAergic projection to the subthalamic nucleus, which then sends glutamatergic projections to the GPi and SNpr. Both the GPi and SNpr send inhibitory projections to nuclei within the thalamus.

== Function ==
MSNs are inhibitory GABAergic neurons, but the effect of direct MSNs (dMSNs) and indirect MSNs (iMSNs) on their ultimate output structures differs: dMSNs excite, while iMSNs inhibit, their basal ganglia output structures (e.g., the thalamus). Within the basal ganglia, there are several complex circuits of neuronal loops all of which include medium spiny neurons.

The cortical, thalamic, and brain-stem inputs that arrive at the medium spiny neurons show a vast divergence in that each incoming axon forms contacts with many spiny neurons and each spiny neuron receives a vast amount of input from different incoming axons. Since these inputs are glutamatergic they exhibit an excitatory influence on the inhibitory medium spiny neurons.

There are also interneurons in the striatum which regulate the excitability of the medium spiny neurons. The synaptic connections between a particular GABAergic interneuron, the parvalbumin expressing fast-spiking interneuron, and spiny neurons are close to the spiny neurons' soma, or cell body. Recall that excitatory postsynaptic potentials caused by glutamatergic inputs at the dendrites of the spiny neurons only cause an action potential when the depolarization wave is strong enough upon entering the cell soma. Since the fast-spiking interneurons influence is located so closely to this critical gate between the dendrites and the soma, they can readily regulate the generation of an action potential. Additionally, other types of GABAergic interneurons make connections with the spiny neurons. These include interneurons that express tyrosine hydroxylase and neuropeptide Y.

== Dorsal striatal MSNs ==
=== Direct pathway ===
==== Anatomy ====
The direct pathway within the basal ganglia receives excitatory input from the cortex, thalamus, and other brain regions. In the direct pathway, medium spiny neurons project to the internal division of the globus pallidus (GPi) or the substantia nigra pars reticula (SNpr or SNr). These nuclei project to the deep layer of the superior colliculus and control fast eye movements (saccades), and also project to the ventral thalamus, which in turn projects to upper motor neurons in the primary motor cortex (precentral gyrus). The SNr and GPi outputs are both tonically active inhibitory nuclei and are thus constantly inhibiting the thalamus (and thus motor cortex). However, transient activity in (inhibitory) direct pathway medium spiny neurons ultimately disinhibits thalamus projections to the motor cortex and enables movement.

=== Indirect pathway ===
==== Anatomy ====
The indirect pathway also receives excitatory input from various brain regions. Indirect pathway medium spiny neurons project to the external segment of the globus pallidus (GPe). Like the GPi, the GPe is a tonically active inhibitory nucleus. The GPe projects to the excitatory subthalamic nucleus (STN), which in turn projects to the GPi and SNr. When the indirect pathway is not activated, activity in the STN is suppressed by the GPe, which translates to decreased SNr/GPi activity downstream and thus increased thalamic and motor cortex neuron activity. When indirect pathway neurons fire, GPe neurons are inhibited, which disinhibits the STN. The STN then excites SNr/GPi neurons, suppressing thalamus/motor cortex activity.

=== Functional distinctions ===
Classic models of striatal function have posited that activation of the direct pathway leads to movement, whereas activation of the indirect pathway leads to the termination of movement. This model is supported by experiments demonstrating that optogenetically stimulating direct pathway medium spiny neurons increases locomotion, whereas stimulating indirect pathway medium spiny neurons inhibits locomotion. The balance of direct/indirect activity in movement is supported by evidence from neurodegenerative disorders, including Parkinson's disease (PD), which is characterized by loss of dopamine neurons projecting to the striatum, hypoactivity in direct pathway and hyperactivity in indirect pathway neurons, along with motor dysfunction. This results in loss of normal action selection, as loss of dopamine drives activity in the indirect pathway, globally inhibiting all motor paradigms. This may explain impaired action initiation, slowed actions (bradykinesia), and impaired voluntary motor initiation in Parkinson's patients. On the other hand, Huntington's disease, which is characterized by preferential degradation of indirect pathway medium spiny neurons, results in unwanted movements (chorea) that may result from impaired movement inhibition and predominant direct pathway activity. An alternative related hypothesis is that the striatum controls action initiation and selection via a 'center-surround' architecture, where activation of a subset of direct pathway neurons initiates movements while closely related motor patterns represented by surrounding neurons are inhibited by lateral inhibition via indirect pathway neurons. This specific hypothesis is supported by recent calcium-imaging work showing that direct and indirect pathway medium spiny neurons encoding specific actions are located in spatially organized ensembles.

Despite the abundance of evidence for the initiation/termination model, recent evidence using transgenic mice expressing calcium indicators in either the direct or indirect pathway demonstrated that both pathways are active at action initiation, but neither are active during inactivity, a finding which has been replicated using simultaneous two-channel calcium imaging. This has led to somewhat of a paradigm shift in models of striatal functioning, such that newer models posit that the direct pathway facilitates wanted movements, whereas the indirect pathway simultaneously inhibits unwanted movements. Indeed, more sophisticated techniques and analyses, such as state-dependent optogenetics, have revealed that both pathways are heavily involved in action sequence execution, and that specifically, both striatal pathways are involved in element-level action control. However, direct pathway medium spiny neurons mostly signal sequence initiation/termination and indirect pathway medium spiny neurons may signal switching between subsequences of a given action sequence. Other evidence suggests that the direct and indirect pathway oppositely influence the termination of movement—specifically, the relative timing of their activity determines if an action will be terminated.

Recent experiments have established that the direct and indirect pathways of the dorsal striatum are not solely involved in movement. Initial experiments in an intracranial self-stimulation paradigm suggested opposing roles in reinforcement for the two pathways; specifically, stimulation of direct pathway medium spiny neurons was found to be reinforcing, whereas stimulation of indirect pathway medium spiny neurons was aversive. However, a subsequent study (using more physiologically relevant stimulation parameters) found that direct and indirect pathway stimulation was reinforcing, but that pathway-specific stimulation resulted in the development of different action strategies. Regardless, these studies suggest a critical role for reinforcement in the dorsal striatum, as opposed to the striatum only serving a role in movement control.

== Ventral striatal MSNs ==
=== Direct pathway ===
The direct pathway of the ventral striatum within the basal ganglia mediates reward-based learning and appetitive incentive salience, which is assigned to rewarding stimuli.

=== Indirect pathway ===
The indirect pathway of the ventral striatum within the basal ganglia mediates aversion-based learning and aversive motivational salience, which is assigned to aversive stimuli.

== See also ==
List of distinct cell types in the adult human body
