= Striatum =

Nucleus in the basal ganglia of the brain

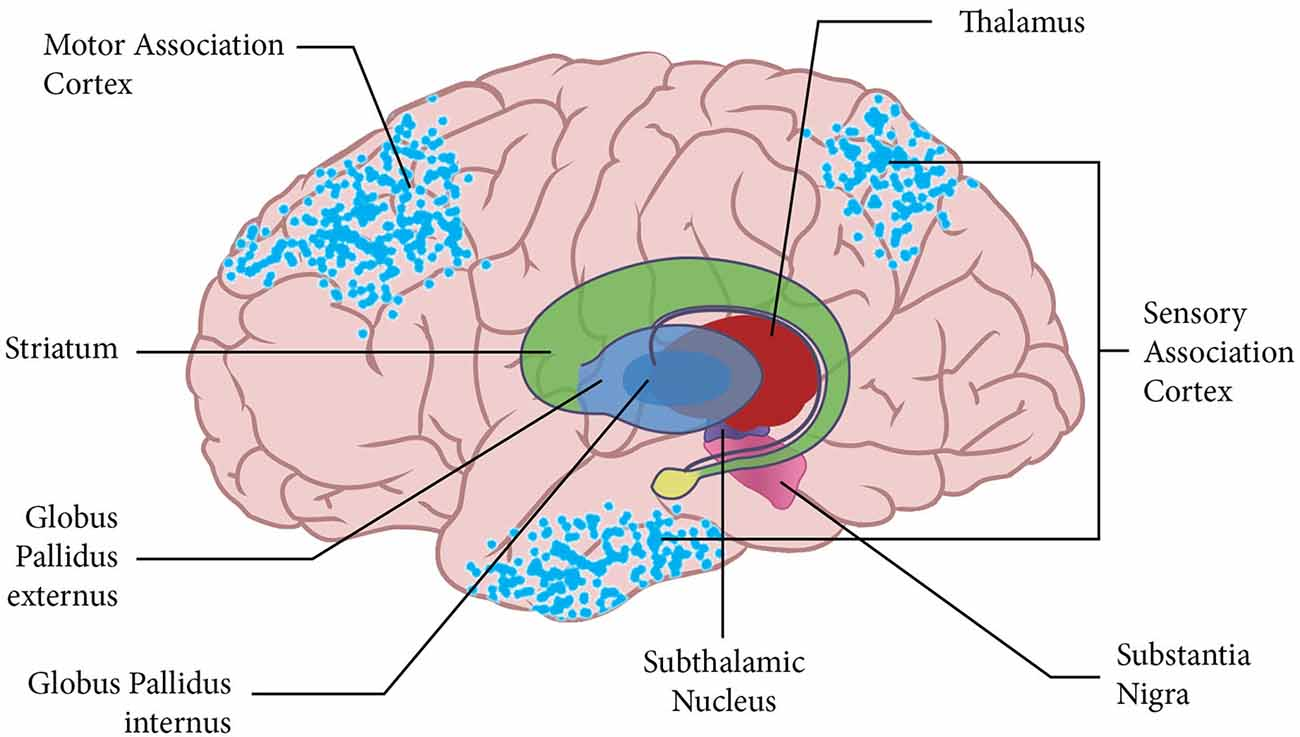
- Striatum shown in green with other basal ganglia and thalamus. Small region in yellow is the amygdala

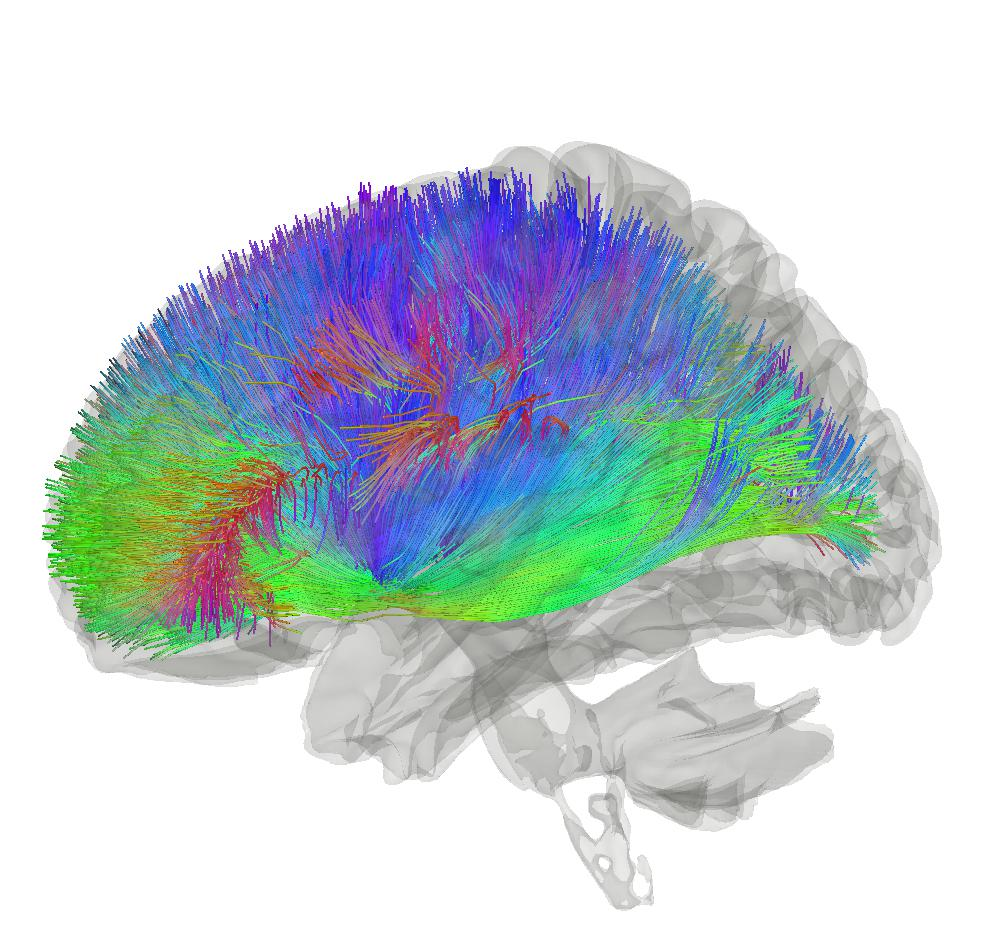
- Tractography showing corticostriatal connections

Details
- Part of: Basal ganglia Reward system
- Parts: Ventral striatum Dorsal striatum

Identifiers
- Latin: striatum
- MeSH: D003342
- NeuroNames: 225
- NeuroLex ID: birnlex_1672
- TA98: A14.1.09.516; A14.1.09.515
- TA2: 5559
- FMA: 77616 77618, 77616

The striatum (pl.: striata) is a cluster of interconnected nuclei that make up the largest structure of the subcortical basal ganglia. The striatum is a critical component of the motor and reward systems; it receives glutamatergic and dopaminergic inputs from different sources; and serves as the primary input to the rest of the basal ganglia. Functionally, the striatum coordinates multiple aspects of cognition, including both motor and action planning, decision-making, motivation, reinforcement, and reward perception. The striatum is made up of the caudate nucleus, the putamen, and the ventral striatum.

In primates, the striatum is divided into the ventral striatum and the dorsal striatum, subdivisions that are based upon function and connections. The ventral striatum consists of the nucleus accumbens and the olfactory tubercle. The dorsal striatum consists of the caudate nucleus and the putamen. A white matter nerve tract (the internal capsule) in the dorsal striatum separates the caudate nucleus and the putamen. Anatomically, the term striatum describes its striped (striated) appearance of grey-and-white matter.

== Nomenclature ==
The terms striatum and neostriatum refer to the caudate nucleus and the putamen. Two more terms have seen historic use, but are now antiquated: the term corpus striatum refers to both the neostriatum and the globus pallidus, while the term lentiform nucleus refers to the putamen and globus pallidus, excluding the striatum.

== Structure ==
The striatum is the largest structure of the basal ganglia. The striatum is divided into two subdivisions, a ventral striatum and a dorsal striatum, based upon function and connections. It is also divisible into a matrix and embedded striosomes.

=== Ventral striatum ===
The ventral striatum is composed of the nucleus accumbens and the olfactory tubercle. The nucleus accumbens is made up of the nucleus accumbens core and the nucleus accumbens shell, which differ by neural populations. The olfactory tubercle receives input from the olfactory bulb but has not been shown to play a role in processing smell. In non-primate species, the islands of Calleja are included. The ventral striatum is associated with the limbic system and has been implicated as a vital part of the circuitry for decision making and reward-related behavior.

=== Dorsal striatum ===
The dorsal striatum is composed of the caudate nucleus and the putamen. Primarily it mediates cognition and involves motor and executive function. The dorsal striatum can be further subdivided into the dorsomedial striatum, and the dorsolateral striatum. Both of these areas have different roles in the acquisition of learnt behaviour and skill formation. The dorsomedial region receives projections from the frontal and the parietal cortices. The dorsolateral region receives projections from the sensorimotor cortex.

==== Matrix and striosomes ====
Neurochemistry studies have used staining techniques on the striatum that have identified two distinct striatal compartments, the matrix, and the striosome (or patch). The matrix is seen to be rich in acetylcholinesterase, while the embedded striosomes are acetylcholinesterase-poor. The matrix forms the bulk of the striatum, and receives input from most areas of the cerebral cortex. Clusters of neurons in the matrix, called matrisomes receive a similar input. Their output goes to both regions of the globus pallidus and to the substantia nigra pars reticulata.

The striosomes receive input from the prefrontal cortex and give outputs to the substantia nigra pars compacta. There are more striosomes present in the dorsal striatum making up 10-15% of the striatal volume, than in the ventral striatum.

=== Cell types ===
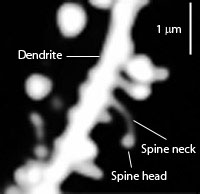
Dendritic spines on medium spiny neuron of striatum

Types of cells in the striatum include:

- Medium spiny neurons (MSNs), which are the principal neurons of the striatum. They are GABAergic and, thus, are classified as inhibitory neurons. Medium spiny projection neurons comprise 95% of the total neuronal population of the human striatum. Medium spiny neurons have two characteristic types: D1-type MSNs and D2-type MSNs. A subpopulation of MSNs contain both D1-type and D2-type receptors, with approximately 40% of striatal MSNs expressing both DRD1 and DRD2 mRNA.
- Cholinergic interneurons release acetylcholine, which has a variety of important effects in the striatum. In humans, other primates, and rodents, these interneurons respond to salient environmental stimuli with stereotyped responses that are temporally aligned with the responses of dopaminergic neurons of the substantia nigra. The large aspiny cholinergic interneurons themselves are affected by dopamine through D5 dopamine receptors. Dopamine also directly controls communication between cholinergic interneurons.
- There are many types of GABAergic interneurons. The best known are parvalbumin expressing interneurons, also known as fast-spiking interneurons, which participate in powerful feedforward inhibition of principal neurons. Also, there are GABAergic interneurons that express tyrosine hydroxylase, somatostatin, nitric oxide synthase and neuropeptide-y. Recently, two types of neuropeptide-y expressing GABAergic interneurons have been described in detail, one of which translates synchronous activity of cholinergic interneurons into inhibition of principal neurons. These neurons of the striatum are not distributed evenly.

There are two regions of neurogenesis in the brain – the subventricular zone (SVZ) in the lateral ventricles, and the dentate gyrus in the hippocampal formation. Neuroblasts that form in the lateral ventricle adjacent to the striatum, integrate in the striatum. This has been noted in the human striatum following an ischemic stroke. Injury caused to the striatum stimulates the migration of neuroblasts from the SVZ, to the striatum, where they differentiate into adult neurons. The normal passage of SVZ neuroblasts is to the olfactory bulb but this traffic is diverted to the striatum after an ischemic stroke. However, few of the new developed neurons survive.

=== Inputs ===
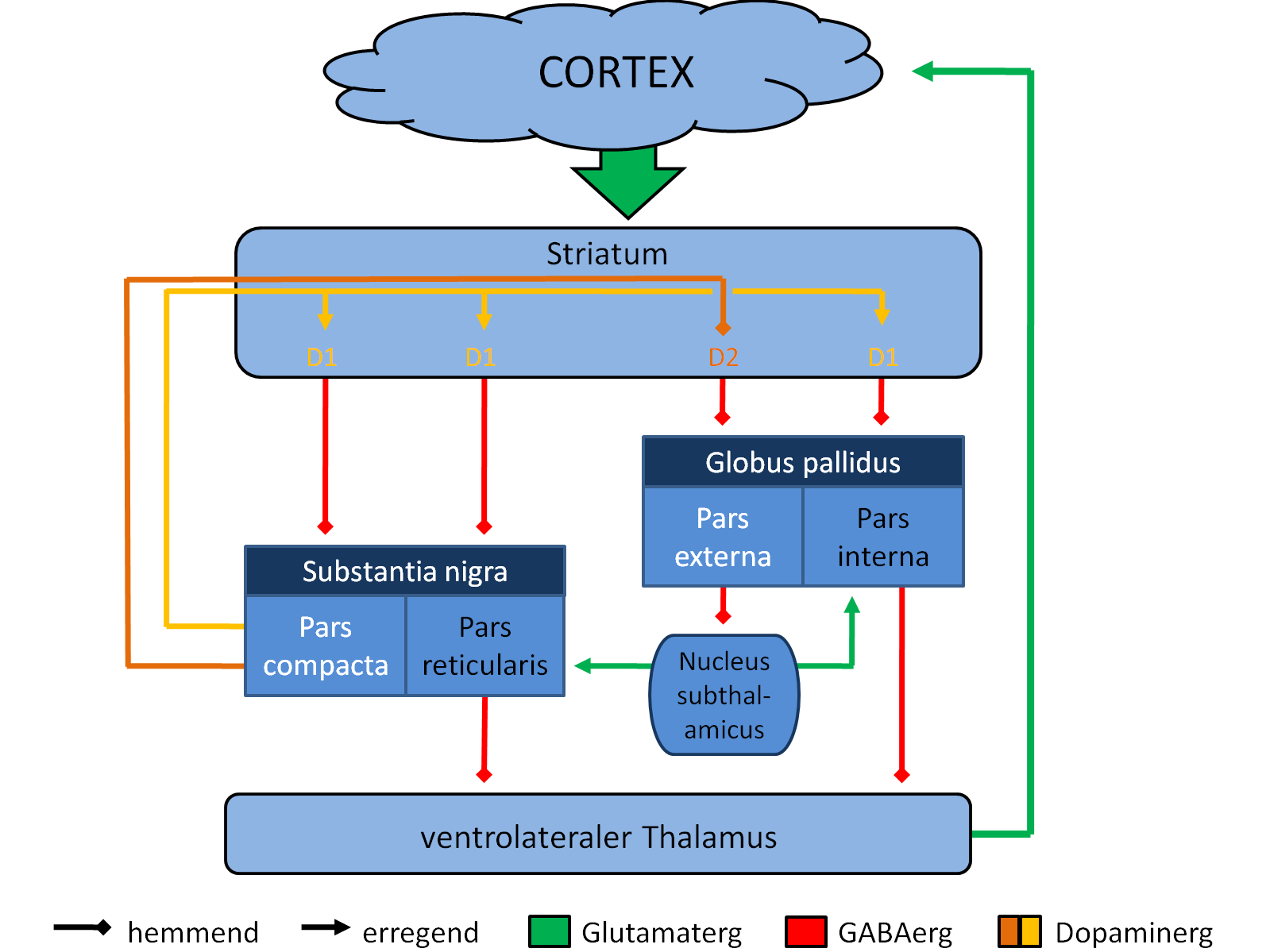
Simplified diagram of frontal cortex to striatum to thalamus pathways – frontostriatal circuit

Overview of the main circuits of the basal ganglia. The striatum is shown in blue. Picture shows 2 coronal slices that have been superimposed to include the involved basal ganglia structures. + and – signs at the point of the arrows indicate respectively whether the pathway is excitatory or inhibitory in effect. Green arrows refer to excitatory glutamatergic pathways, red arrows refer to inhibitory GABAergic pathways and turquoise arrows refer to dopaminergic pathways that are excitatory on the direct pathway and inhibitory on the indirect pathway.

The largest connection is from the cortex, in terms of cell axons. Many parts of the neocortex innervate the dorsal striatum. The cortical pyramidal neurons projecting to the striatum are located in layers II-VI, with the most dense projections come from layer V. They end mainly on the dendritic spines of the spiny neurons. They are glutamatergic, exciting striatal neurons.

The striatum is seen as having its own internal microcircuitry. The ventral striatum receives direct input from multiple regions in the cerebral cortex and limbic structures such as the amygdala, thalamus, and hippocampus, as well as the entorhinal cortex and the inferior temporal gyrus. Its primary input is to the basal ganglia system. Additionally, the mesolimbic pathway projects from the ventral tegmental area to the nucleus accumbens of the ventral striatum.

Another well-known afferent is the nigrostriatal connection arising from the neurons of the substantia nigra pars compacta. While cortical axons synapse mainly on spine heads of spiny neurons, nigral axons synapse mainly on spine shafts. In primates, the thalamostriatal afferent comes from the central median-parafascicular complex of the thalamus (see primate basal ganglia system). This afferent is glutamatergic. The participation of truly intralaminar neurons is much more limited. The striatum also receives afferents from other elements of the basal ganglia such as the subthalamic nucleus (glutamatergic) or the external globus pallidus (GABAergic).

=== Targets ===
The primary outputs of the ventral striatum project to the ventral pallidum, then the medial dorsal nucleus of the thalamus, which is part of the frontostriatal circuit. Additionally, the ventral striatum projects to the globus pallidus, and substantia nigra pars reticulata. Some of its other outputs include projections to the extended amygdala, lateral hypothalamus, and pedunculopontine nucleus.

Striatal outputs from both the dorsal and ventral components are primarily composed of medium spiny neurons (MSNs), a type of projection neuron, which have two primary phenotypes: "indirect" MSNs that express D2-like receptors and "direct" MSNs that express D1-like receptors.

The main nucleus of the basal ganglia is the striatum which projects directly to the globus pallidus via a pathway of striatopallidal fibers. The striato-pallidal pathway has a whitish appearance due to the myelinated fibers. This projection comprises successively the external globus pallidus (GPe), the internal globus pallidus (GPi), the pars compacta of the substantia nigra (SNc), and the pars reticulata of substantia nigra (SNr). The neurons of this projection are inhibited by GABAergic synapses from the dorsal striatum. Among these targets, the GPe does not send axons outside the system. Others send axons to the superior colliculus. Two others comprise the output to the thalamus, forming two separate channels: one through the internal segment of the globus pallidus to the ventral oralis nuclei of the thalamus and from there to the cortical supplementary motor area and another through the substantia nigra to the ventral anterior nuclei of the thalamus and from there to the frontal cortex and the occulomotor cortex.

=== Blood supply ===
Deep penetrating striate arteries supply blood to the striatum. These arteries include the recurrent artery of Heubner arising from the anterior cerebral artery, and the lenticulostriate arteries arising from the middle cerebral artery.

== Function ==
The ventral striatum, and the nucleus accumbens in particular, primarily mediates reward, cognition, reinforcement, and motivational salience. By contrast, the dorsal striatum primarily mediates cognition involving motor function, certain executive functions (e.g., inhibitory control and impulsivity), and stimulus-response learning. There is a small degree of overlap, as the dorsal striatum is also a component of the reward system that, along with the nucleus accumbens core, mediates the encoding of new motor programs associated with future reward acquisition (e.g., the conditioned motor response to a reward cue).

The striatum is also thought to play a role in an at least partially dissociable executive control network for language, applied to both verbal working memory and verbal attention. These models take the form of a frontal-striatal network for language processing. While the striatum is often not included in models of language processing, as most models only include cortical regions, integrative models are becoming more popular in light of imaging studies, lesion studies on aphasic patients, and studies of language disorders concomitant with diseases known to affect the striatum like Parkinson's and Huntington's disease.

Metabotropic dopamine receptors are present both on spiny neurons and on cortical axon terminals. Second messenger cascades triggered by activation of these dopamine receptors can modulate pre- and postsynaptic function, both in the short term and in the long term. In humans, the striatum is activated by stimuli associated with reward, but also by aversive, novel, unexpected, or intense stimuli, and cues associated with such events. fMRI evidence suggests that the common property linking these stimuli, to which the striatum is reacting, is salience under the conditions of presentation. A number of other brain areas and circuits are also related to reward, such as frontal areas. Functional maps of the striatum reveal interactions with widely distributed regions of the cerebral cortex important to a diverse range of functions.

The interplay between the striatum and the prefrontal cortex is relevant for behavior, particularly adolescent development as proposed by the dual systems model.

== Clinical significance ==
=== Parkinson's disease and other movement disorders ===
Parkinson's disease results in loss of dopaminergic innervation to the dorsal striatum (and other basal ganglia) and a cascade of consequences. Atrophy of the striatum is also involved in Huntington's disease, and movement disorders such as chorea, choreoathetosis, and dyskinesias. These have also been described as circuit disorders of the basal ganglia.

=== Addiction ===
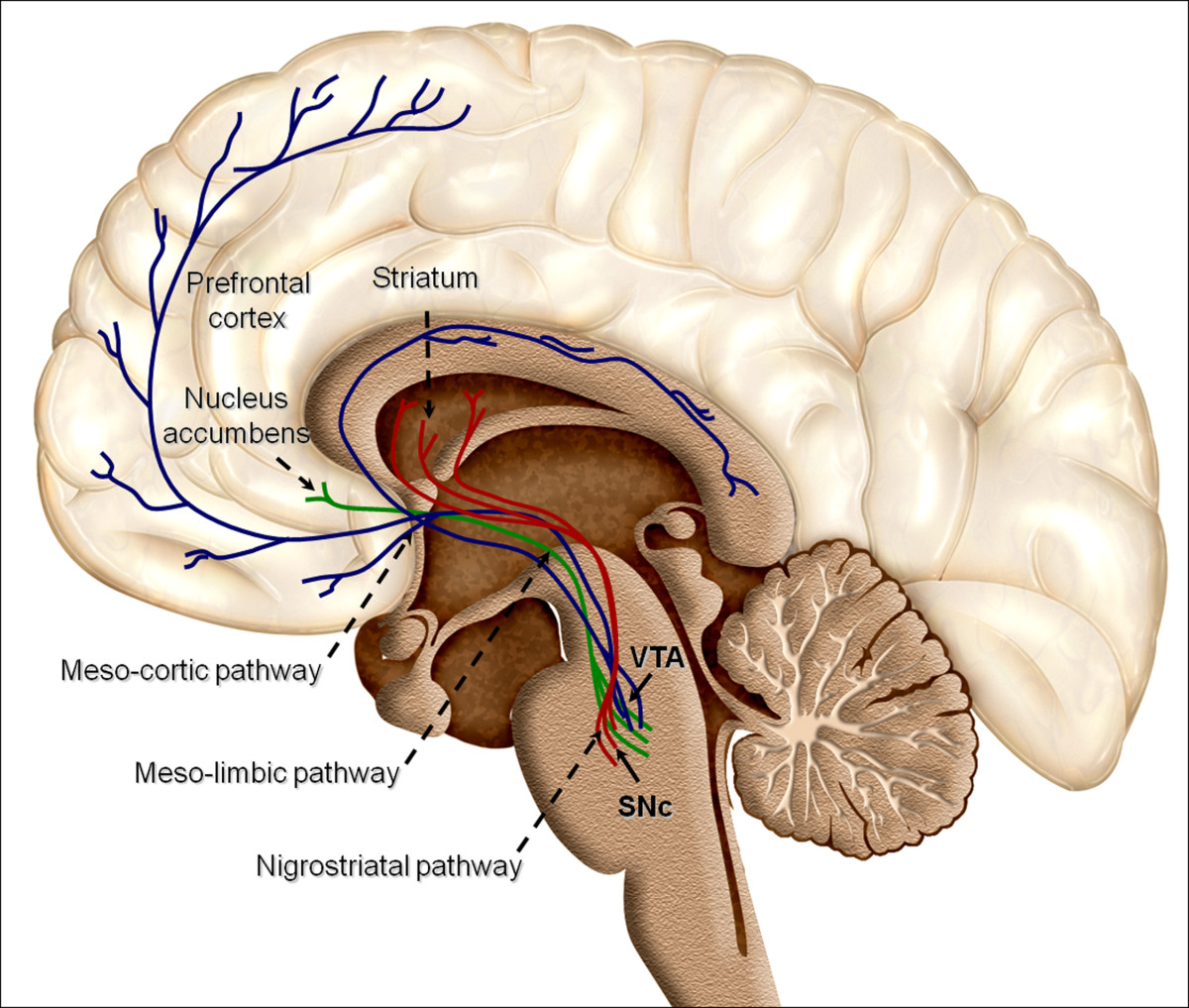
Overview of reward structures and associated pathways

Addiction, a disorder of the brain's reward system, arises through the overexpression of DeltaFosB (ΔFosB), a transcription factor, in the D1-type medium spiny neurons of the ventral striatum. ΔFosB is an inducible gene which is increasingly expressed in the nucleus accumbens as a result of repeatedly using an addictive drug or overexposure to other addictive stimuli.

=== Schizophrenia spectrum disorders ===
The mesolimbic hypothesis of schizophrenia has long emphasized the role of hyperdopaminergia in the mesolimbic pathway, which extends from the ventral tegmental area to the ventral striatum. Abnormally elevated dopaminergic transmission in this pathway has been associated with the emergence of positive symptoms, such as hallucinations and delusions. Most antipsychotic treatments exert their effects by reducing dopamine binding to receptors in this region. More recent evidence, however, suggests that the pathway from the substantia nigra to the dorsal striatum may also play a significant role in the pathophysiology of schizophrenia. This has led to the development of the mesostriatal hypothesis, which expands the focus beyond the ventral striatum to include dopaminergic dysfunction in the dorsal components of the striatum and could help accounting for the negative and cognitive symptoms.

=== Bipolar disorder ===
An association has been observed between striatal expression of variants of the PDE10A gene and some bipolar I disorder patients. Variants of other genes, DISC1 and GNAS, have been associated with bipolar II disorder.

=== Autism spectrum disorder ===
Autism spectrum disorder (ASD) is characterized by cognitive inflexibility and poor understanding of social systems. This inflexible behavior originates in defects in the prefrontal cortex as well as the striatal circuits. The defects in the striatum seem to specifically contribute to the motor, social and communication impairments seen in ASD patients. In mice which have an ASD-like phenotype induced via the overexpression of the eukaryotic initiation of translation factor 4E, it has been shown that these defects seem to stem from the reduced ability to store and process information in the striatum, which leads to the difficulty seen in forming new motor patterns, as well as disengaging from existing ones.

=== Dysfunction ===
Dysfunction in the ventral striatum can lead to a variety of disorders, most notably depression and obsessive-compulsive disorder. Because of its involvement in reward pathways, the ventral striatum has also been implicated in playing a critical role in addiction. It has been well established that the ventral striatum is strongly involved in mediating the reinforcing effects of drugs, especially stimulants, through dopaminergic stimulation.

=== Language disorders ===
Lesions to the striatum have been associated with deficits in speech production and comprehension. While striatal damage can impact all levels of language, damage can broadly be characterized as affecting the ability to manipulate linguistic units and rules, resulting in the promotion of default linguistic forms in conflicting situations in which selection, inhibition, and monitoring load is increased. Two subregions of the striatum have been shown to be particularly important in language: the caudate nucleus and left putamen. Lesions localized to the caudate nucleus, as well as direct electrical stimulation, can result in lexical paraphasias and perservations (continuations of an utterance after the stimulus has ceased), which is associated with inhibited executive control, in the sense that executive control allows for the selection of the best choice among competing alternatives. Stimulation of the putamen results in the inhibition of articulatory sequences and the inability to initiate motor speech commands.

== History ==
In the seventeenth and eighteenth centuries, the term corpus striatum was used to designate many distinct, deep, infracortical elements of the hemisphere. Etymologically, it is derived from (Latin) striatus = "grooved, striated" and the English striated = having parallel lines or grooves on the surface. In 1876 David Ferrier contributed decades of research to the subject; concluding that the corpus striatum was vital in the "organization and generation of voluntary movement". In 1941, Cécile and Oskar Vogt simplified the nomenclature by proposing the term striatum for all elements in the basal ganglia built with striatal elements: the caudate nucleus, the putamen, and the fundus striati, which is the ventral part linking the two preceding together ventrally to the inferior part of the internal capsule.

The term neostriatum was coined by comparative anatomists comparing the subcortical structures between vertebrates, because it was thought to be a phylogenetically newer section of the corpus striatum. The term is still used by some sources, including Medical Subject Headings.

== Other animals ==
In birds the term used was the paleostriatum augmentatum, while in the new avian terminology listing (as of 2002) for neostriatum this has been changed to the nidopallium.

In non-primate species, the islands of Calleja are included in the ventral striatum.

== See also ==
- Cortico-basal ganglia-thalamo-cortical loop
- List of regions in the human brain
- Striatopallidal fibres

== Additional images ==
Striatum highlighted in green on coronal T1 MRI images

Striatum highlighted in green on sagittal T1 MRI images

Striatum highlighted in green on transversal T1 MRI images

An animation showing the location of the striatum in the human brain.

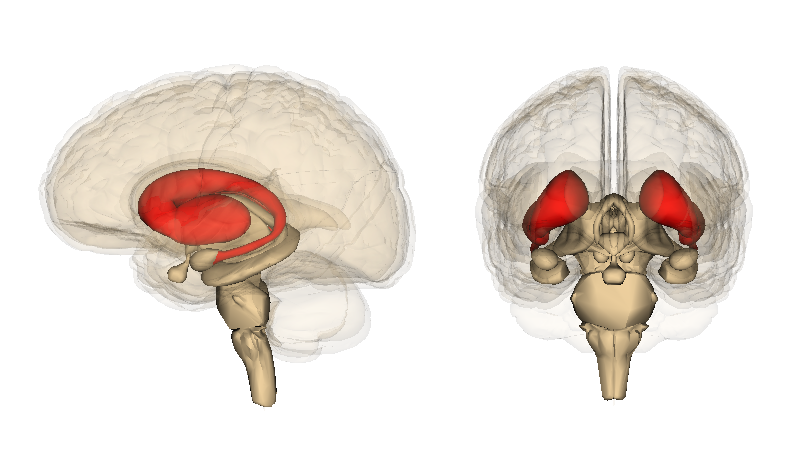
Anatomy of the striatum within the human brain.

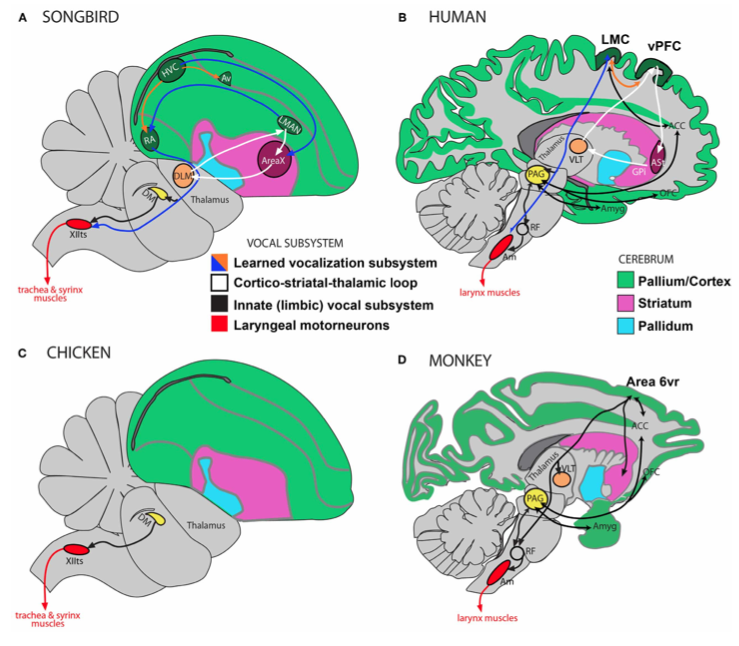
Vocalization subsystems in complex-vocal learners and limited-vocal learners.

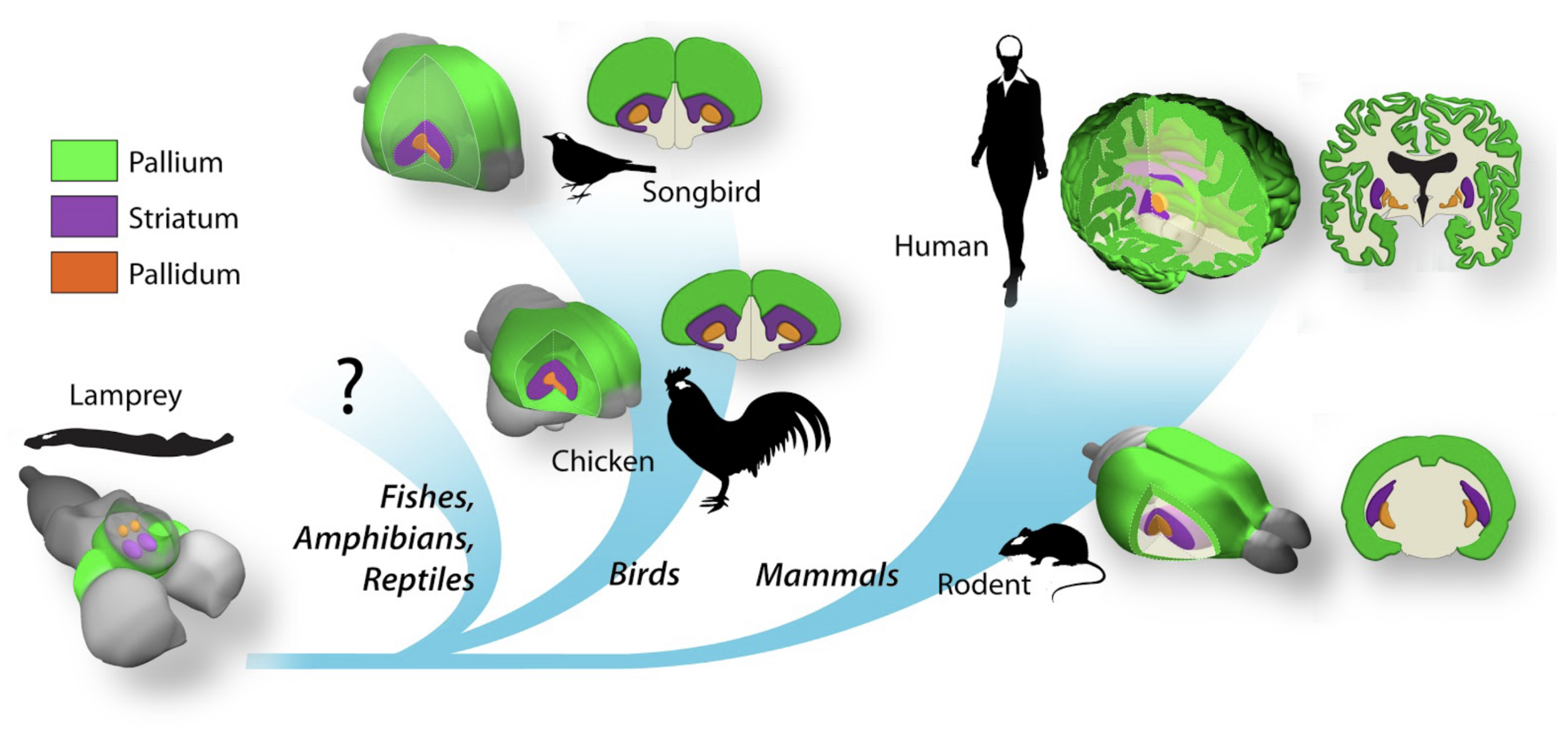
Comparative evolution of the striatum and pallium in vertebrates. The ratio of the brain mass devoted to the pallium increases in parallel in various vertebrate taxa.
