= Félix Vicq-d'Azyr =

French anatomist (1748–1794)

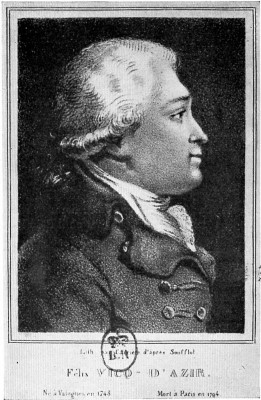
- Félix Vicq-d'Azyr
- Born: 23 April 1748; Valognes, Normandy
- Died: 20 June 1794 (aged 46); Paris
- Education: University of Paris
- Known for: comparative anatomy homology
- Scientific career
- Fields: physician anatomist

Félix Vicq d'Azyr (French: [feliks vik daziʁ]; 23 April 1748 – 20 June 1794) was a French physician and anatomist, the originator of comparative anatomy and discoverer of the theory of homology in biology.

== Biography ==
Vicq d'Azyr was born in Valognes, Normandy, the son of a physician. He graduated in medicine at the University of Paris and became a renowned animal and human anatomist and physician.

From 1773, Vicq d'Azyr taught a celebrated course of anatomy at the Jardin du Roi, currently the Museum of Natural History, in Paris. In 1774, he was elected a member of the Académie des Sciences with the support of his friend Condorcet, the Perpetual Secretary. In this latter capacity, he was in charge of writing the eulogies of his colleagues. This he accomplished with great talent, thus winning a lifetime membership to the Académie française in 1788. On the outbreak of an epidemic in Guyenne, he was charged with writing a report, of making propositions and with their execution. Pursuing an early perception of the responsibility of the State on health affairs, Anne-Robert-Jacques Turgot proposed the creation of the Société Royale de Médecine. In 1775, Vicq d'Azyr was made Perpetual Secretary. Under his leadership, the Société compiled over 16 years a great mass of facts and information about diseases, physicians, economics and food resources.

He was the last physician of Queen Marie-Antoinette, whom he tried to protect. Additionally he was a professor of veterinary medicine at the School of Alfort, as well as Superintendent of epidemics.

As an anatomist, he was one of the first to use coronal sections of the brain and to use alcohol to aid dissection. He described the locus coeruleus, the locus niger (substantia nigra) in the brain, in 1786, and the band of Vicq d'Azyr, a fiber system between the external granular layer and the external pyramidal layer of the cerebral cortex, as well as the mamillothalamic tract, which bears his name. His systematic studies of the cerebral convolutions became a classic and Vicq d'Azyr was one of the first neuroanatomists to name the gyri. He studied the deep gray nuclei of the cerebrum and the basal ganglia. He participated in the Second Encyclopedia. During the French Revolution he was elected to the Commission temporaire des arts, where he was charged with determining the future of anatomical education in France.

Vicq d'Azyr died of tuberculosis on 20 June 1794 during The Terror. He had that day attended Robespierre's Festival of the Supreme Being. His dramatic biography describes him as spending his last remaining years shaken by nightmares and terrified of the guillotine.

A collection of some of his papers is held at the National Library of Medicine in Bethesda, Maryland.

== Bibliography ==
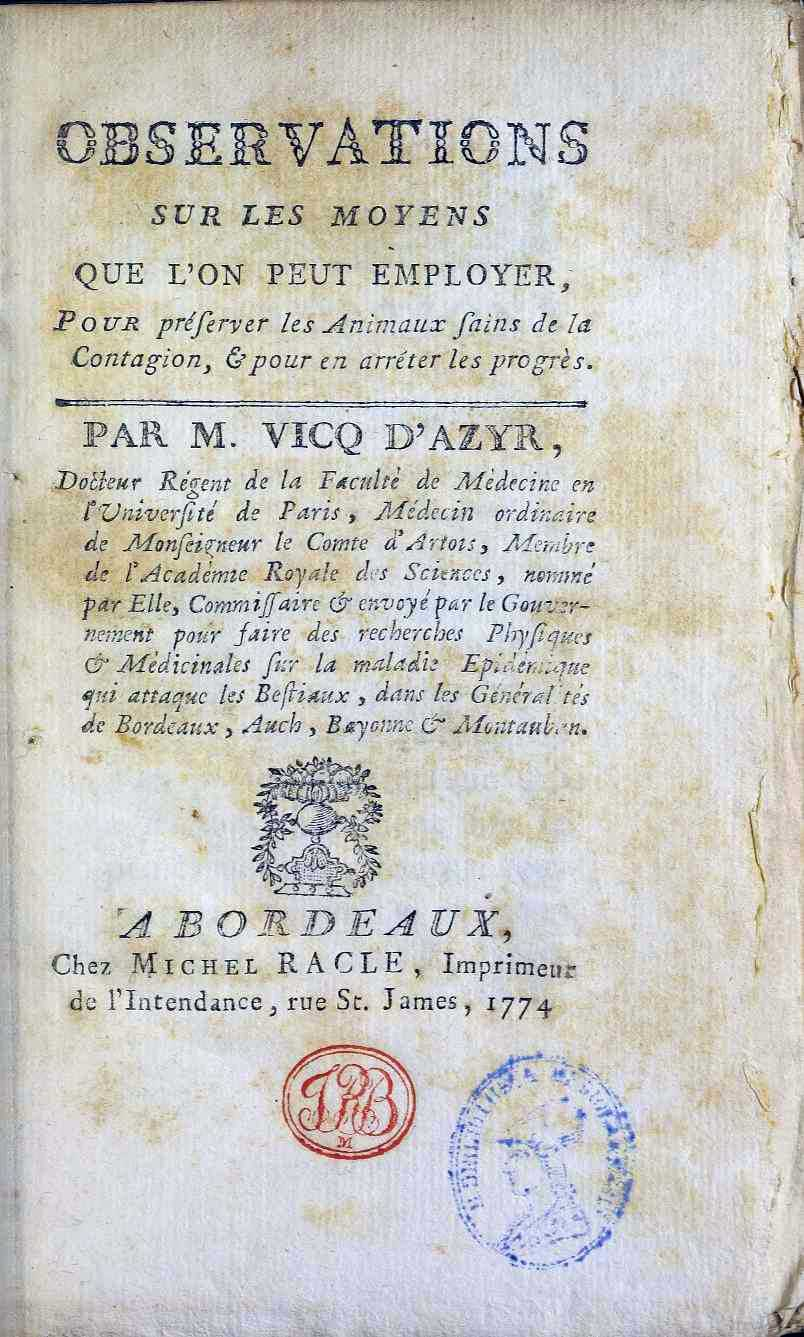
Observations sur les moyens que l'on peut employer, pour préserver les animaux sains de la contagion, et pour en arréter les progrès, 1774

- Observations sur les moyens que l'on peut employer, pour préserver les animaux sains de la contagion, et pour en arréter les progrès (in French). Bordeaux: Michel Racle. 1774.
- Instruction sur la maniere de désinfecter les cuirs des bestiaux morts de l'epizootie (in French). Paris: Imprimerie Royale. 1775.
- Exposé des moyens curatifs & préservatifs qui peuvent être employés contre les maladies pestilentielles des bêtes à cornes (in French). Paris: François Gabriel Merigot. 1776.
- Éloges
- Mémoires sur l'Anatomie Humaine et Comparée
- Traité d'anatomie et de physiologie (in French) (1 ed.). Paris: de l'imprimerie de Franç. Amb. Didot l'aîné. 1786.
- Système Anatomique des Quadrupèdes
