= Basal ganglia =

Group of subcortical nuclei involved in the motor and reward systems

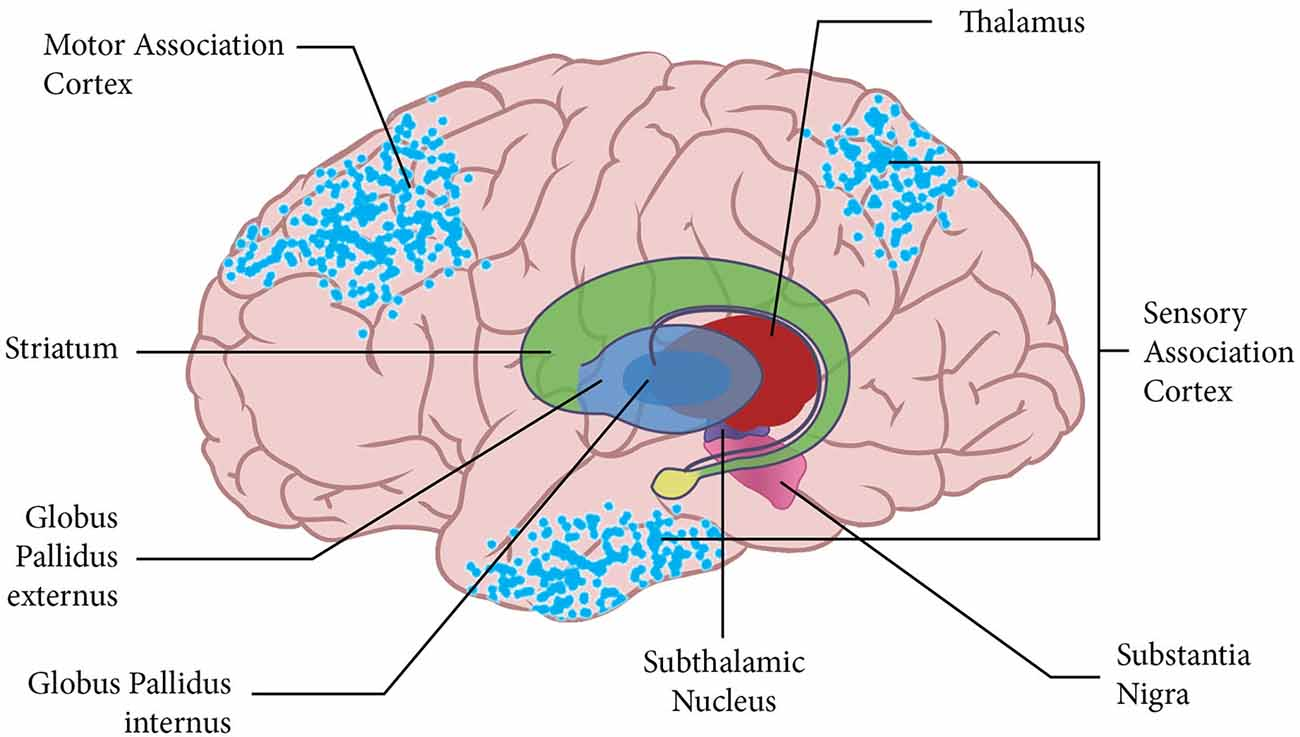
- Schematic of basal ganglia overlain on the cerebral cortex

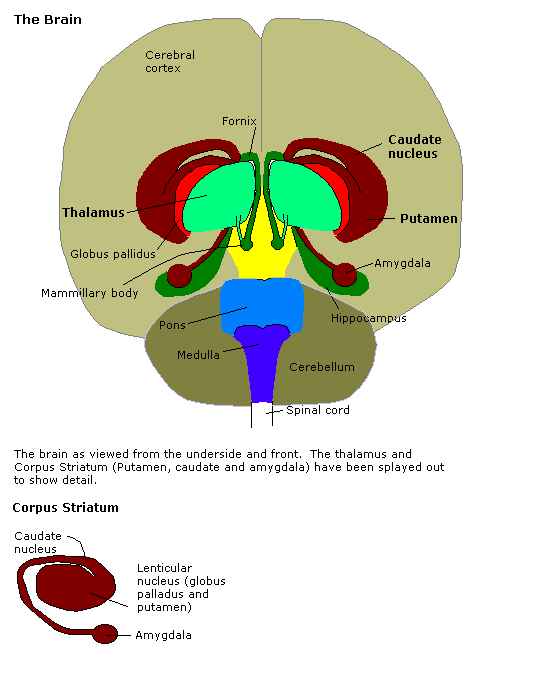
- Basal ganglia from anterior view of brain

Details
- Part of: Cerebrum

Identifiers
- Latin: nuclei basales
- Acronym: BG
- MeSH: D001479
- NeuroNames: 224, 2677
- NeuroLex ID: birnlex_826
- TA98: A14.1.09.501
- TA2: 5559
- FMA: 84013

The basal ganglia (BG) or basal nuclei are a group of subcortical nuclei (cluster of cell bodies) found in the brains of vertebrates. Positioned at the base of the forebrain and the top of the midbrain, they have strong connections with the cerebral cortex, thalamus, brainstem and other brain areas. The basal ganglia are associated with a variety of functions, including regulating voluntary motor movements, procedural learning, habit formation, conditional learning, eye movements, cognition, and emotion.

The main functional components of the basal ganglia include the striatum, consisting of both the dorsal striatum (caudate nucleus and putamen) and the ventral striatum (nucleus accumbens and olfactory tubercle), the globus pallidus, the ventral pallidum, the substantia nigra, and the subthalamic nucleus. Each of these components has complex internal anatomical and neurochemical structures. The largest component, the striatum (dorsal and ventral), receives input from various brain areas but only sends output to other components of the basal ganglia. The globus pallidus receives input from the striatum and sends inhibitory output to a number of motor-related areas. The substantia nigra is the source of the striatal input of the neurotransmitter dopamine, which plays an important role in basal ganglia function. The subthalamic nucleus mainly receives input from the striatum and cerebral cortex and projects to the globus pallidus.

The basal ganglia are thought to play a key role in action selection, aiding in the choice of behaviors to execute. More specifically, they regulate motor and premotor cortical areas, facilitating smooth voluntary movements. Experimental studies show that the basal ganglia exert an inhibitory influence on a number of motor systems, and that a release of this inhibition permits a motor system to become active. The "behavior switching" that takes place within the basal ganglia is influenced by signals from many parts of the brain, including the prefrontal cortex, which plays a key role in executive functions. It has also been hypothesized that the basal ganglia are not only responsible for motor action selection, but also for the selection of more cognitive actions. Computational models of action selection in the basal ganglia incorporate this.

The basal ganglia are of major importance for normal brain function and behaviour. Their dysfunction results in a wide range of neurological conditions including disorders of behaviour control and movement, as well as cognitive deficits that are similar to those that result from damage to the prefrontal cortex. Those of behaviour include Tourette syndrome, obsessive–compulsive disorder, and addiction. Movement disorders include, most notably Parkinson's disease, which involves degeneration of the dopamine-producing cells in the substantia nigra; Huntington's disease, which primarily involves damage to the striatum; dystonia; and more rarely hemiballismus. The basal ganglia have a limbic sector whose components are assigned distinct names: the nucleus accumbens, ventral pallidum, and ventral tegmental area (VTA). There is considerable evidence that this limbic part plays a central role in reward learning as well as cognition and frontal lobe functioning, via the mesolimbic pathway from the VTA to the nucleus accumbens that uses the neurotransmitter dopamine, and the mesocortical pathway. A number of highly addictive drugs, including cocaine, amphetamine, and nicotine, are thought to work by increasing the efficacy of this dopamine signal. There is also evidence implicating overactivity of the VTA dopaminergic projection in schizophrenia.

== Structure ==
In terms of the development of the nervous system in humans, the central nervous system is often classified based on the original three primitive brain vesicles: These primary vesicles form in the normal development of the neural tube of the embryo and initially include the prosencephalon, mesencephalon, and rhombencephalon, in rostral to caudal (from head to tail) orientation. Later in development each section itself turns into smaller components. During development, the cells that migrate tangentially to form the basal ganglia are directed by the lateral and medial ganglionic eminences. The following table demonstrates this developmental classification and traces it to the anatomic structures found in the basal ganglia. The structures relevant to the basal ganglia are shown in bold.

Primary division of the neural tube	Secondary subdivision	Final segments in a human adult
Prosencephalon	1. Telencephalon; 2. Diencephalon	1. On each side of the brain: the cerebral cortices, **caudate**, **putamen**, **Globus pallidus**, **ventral pallidum** 2. Thalamus, subthalamus, epithalamus, hypothalamus, **subthalamic nucleus**
Mesencephalon	1. Mesencephalon	1. Mesencephalon (midbrain): **substantia nigra pars compacta (SNc)**, **substantia nigra pars reticulata (SNr)**
Rhombencephalon	1. Metencephalon; 2. Myelencephalon	1. Pons and cerebellum 2. Medulla

Video of relevant anatomy

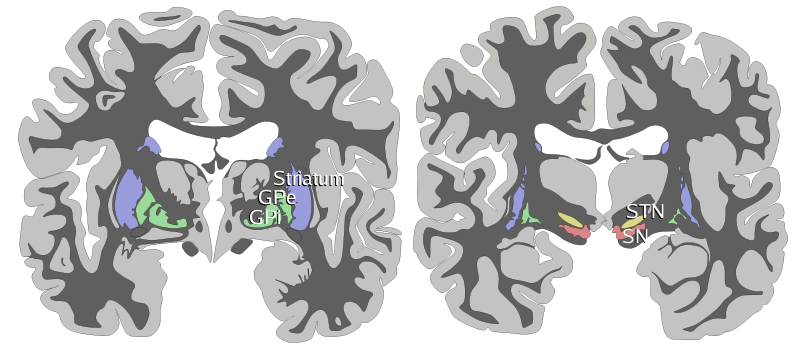
Coronal slices of human brain showing the basal ganglia. White matter is shown in dark gray, gray matter is shown in light gray. Anterior: striatum, globus pallidus (GPe and GPi) Posterior: subthalamic nucleus (STN), substantia nigra (SN)

The basal ganglia form a fundamental component of the cerebrum. In contrast to the cortical layer that lines the surface of the forebrain, the basal ganglia are a collection of distinct masses of gray matter lying deep in the brain not far from the junction of the thalamus. They lie to the side of and surround the thalamus. Like most parts of the brain, the basal ganglia consist of left and right sides that are virtual mirror images of each other.

In terms of anatomy, the basal ganglia are divided into four distinct structures, depending on how superior or rostral they are (in other words depending on how close to the top of the head they are): Two of them, the striatum and the pallidum, are relatively large; the other two, the substantia nigra and the subthalamic nucleus, are smaller. In the illustration to the right, two coronal sections of the human brain show the location of the basal ganglia components. Of note, and not seen in this section, the subthalamic nucleus and substantia nigra lie farther back (posteriorly) in the brain than the striatum and pallidum.

=== Striatum ===
Basal ganglia

The striatum is a subcortical structure generally divided into the dorsal striatum and ventral striatum. The dorsal striatum is further divided into a dorsomedial and dorsolateral striatum.

The striatum is composed mostly of medium spiny neurons. These GABAergic neurons project to the external (lateral) globus pallidus and internal (medial) globus pallidus as well as the substantia nigra pars reticulata. The projections into the globus pallidus and substantia nigra are primarily dopaminergic, although enkephalin, dynorphin and substance P are expressed. The striatum also contains interneurons that are classified into nitrergic neurons (due to use of nitric oxide as a neurotransmitter), tonically active (i.e. constantly releasing neurotransmitter unless inhibited) cholinergic interneurons, parvalbumin-expressing neurons and calretinin-expressing neurons. The dorsal striatum receives significant glutamatergic inputs from the cortex, as well as dopaminergic inputs from the substantia nigra pars compacta. The dorsal striatum is generally considered to be involved in sensorimotor activities. The ventral striatum receives glutamatergic inputs from the limbic areas as well as dopaminergic inputs from the VTA, via the mesolimbic pathway. The ventral striatum is believed to play a role in reward and other limbic functions. The dorsal striatum is divided into the caudate and putamen by the internal capsule while the ventral striatum is composed of the nucleus accumbens and olfactory tubercle. The caudate has three primary regions of connectivity, with the head of the caudate demonstrating connectivity to the prefrontal cortex, cingulate cortex and amygdala. The body and tail show differentiation between the dorsolateral rim and ventral caudate, projecting to the sensorimotor and limbic regions of the striatum respectively. Striatopallidal fibres connect the striatum to the pallidus.

=== Pallidum ===
The pallidum consists of a large structure called the globus pallidus ("pale globe") together with a smaller ventral extension called the ventral pallidum. The globus pallidus appears as a single neural mass, but can be divided into two functionally distinct parts, the internal globus pallidus (GPi) and the external globus pallidus (GPe). Both segments contain primarily GABAergic neurons, which therefore have inhibitory effects on their targets. The two segments participate in distinct neural circuits. The GPe receives input mainly from the striatum, and projects to the subthalamic nucleus. The GPi receives signals from the striatum via the "direct" and "indirect" pathways. Pallidal neurons operate using a disinhibition principle. These neurons fire at steady high rates in the absence of input, and signals from the striatum cause them to pause or reduce their rate of firing. Because pallidal neurons themselves have inhibitory effects on their targets, the net effect of striatal input to the pallidum is a reduction of the tonic inhibition exerted by pallidal cells on their targets (disinhibition) with an increased rate of firing in the targets.

=== Substantia nigra ===
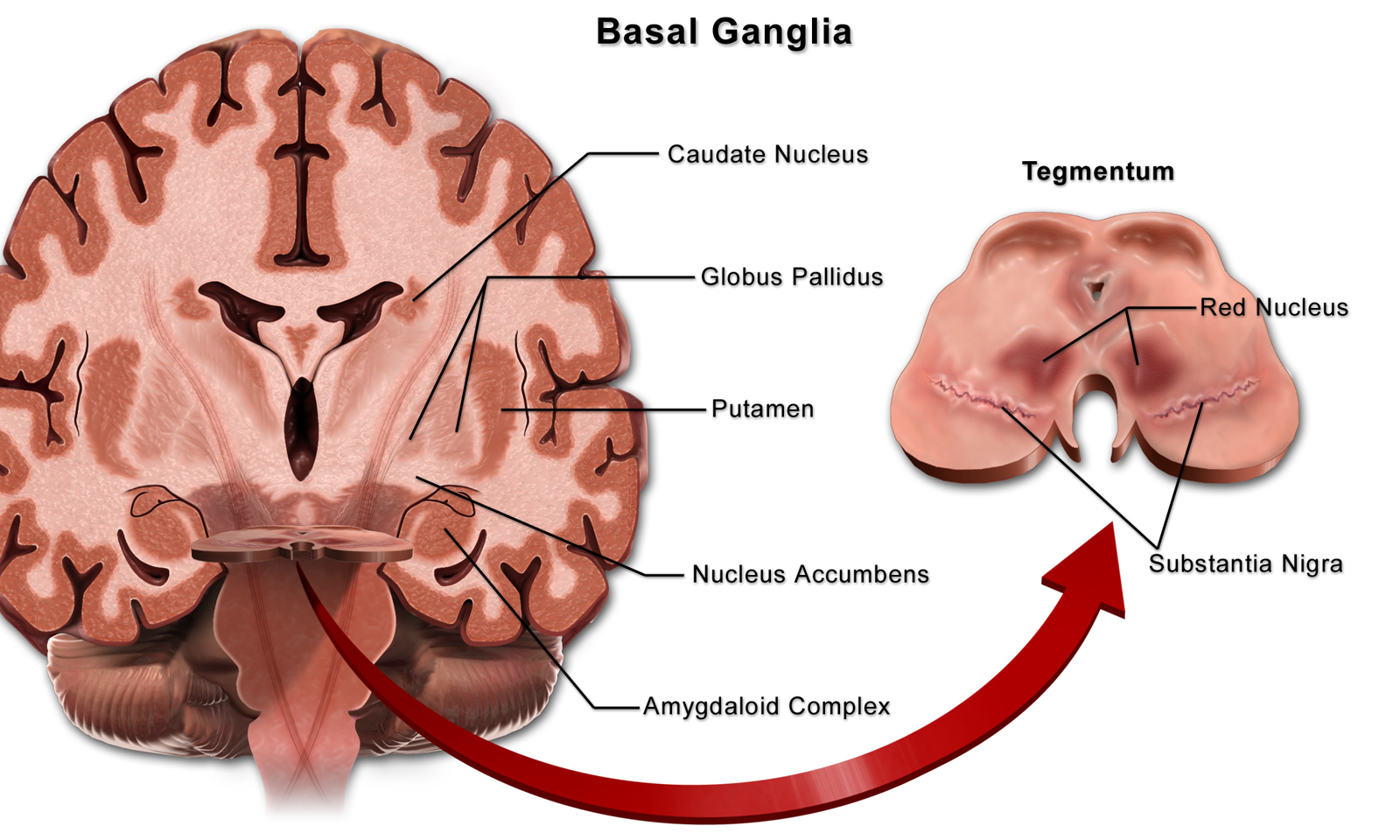
Location of the substantia nigra within the basal ganglia

The substantia nigra is a midbrain gray matter portion of the basal ganglia that has two parts – the pars compacta (SNc) and the pars reticulata (SNr). SNr often works in unison with GPi, and the SNr–GPi complex inhibits the thalamus. Substantia nigra pars compacta (SNc) however, produces the neurotransmitter dopamine, which is very significant in maintaining balance in the striatal pathway. The circuit portion below explains the role and circuit connections of each of the components of the basal ganglia.

=== Subthalamic nucleus ===
The subthalamic nucleus is a diencephalic gray matter portion of the basal ganglia, and the only portion of the ganglia that produces an excitatory neurotransmitter, glutamate. The role of the subthalamic nucleus is to stimulate the SNr–GPi complex and it is part of the indirect pathway. The subthalamic nucleus receives inhibitory input from the external part of the globus pallidus and sends excitatory input to the GPi.

=== Circuit connections ===
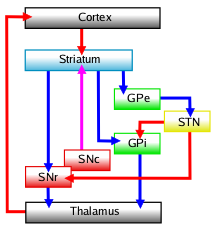
Connectivity diagram showing excitatory glutamatergic pathways as red, inhibitory GABAergic pathways as blue, and modulatory dopaminergic pathways as magenta. (Abbreviations: GPe: globus pallidus external; GPi: globus pallidus internal; STN: subthalamic nucleus; SNc: substantia nigra pars compacta; SNr: substantia nigra pars reticulata)

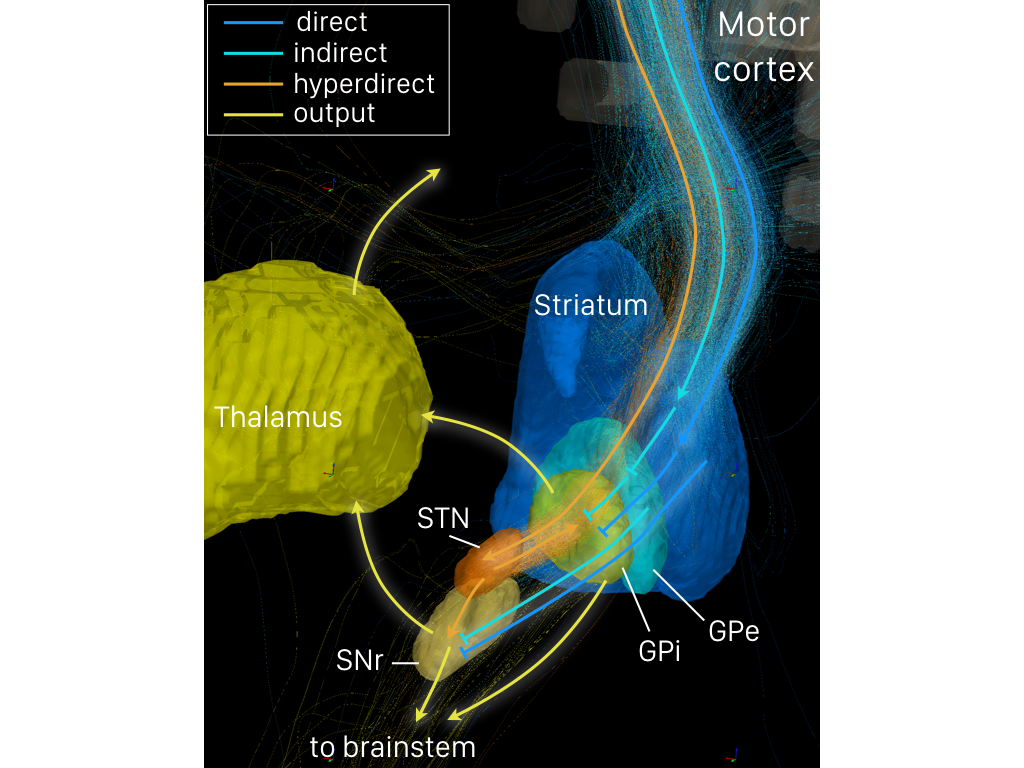
Connectivity of the basal ganglia as revealed by diffusion spectrum imaging based on thirty subjects from the Human Connectome Project. Direct, indirect and hyperdirect pathways are visualized in different colors (see legend). Subcortical structures are rendered based on the Harvard-Oxford subcortical thalamus as well as the Basal Ganglia atlas (other structures). Rendering was generated using TrackVis software.

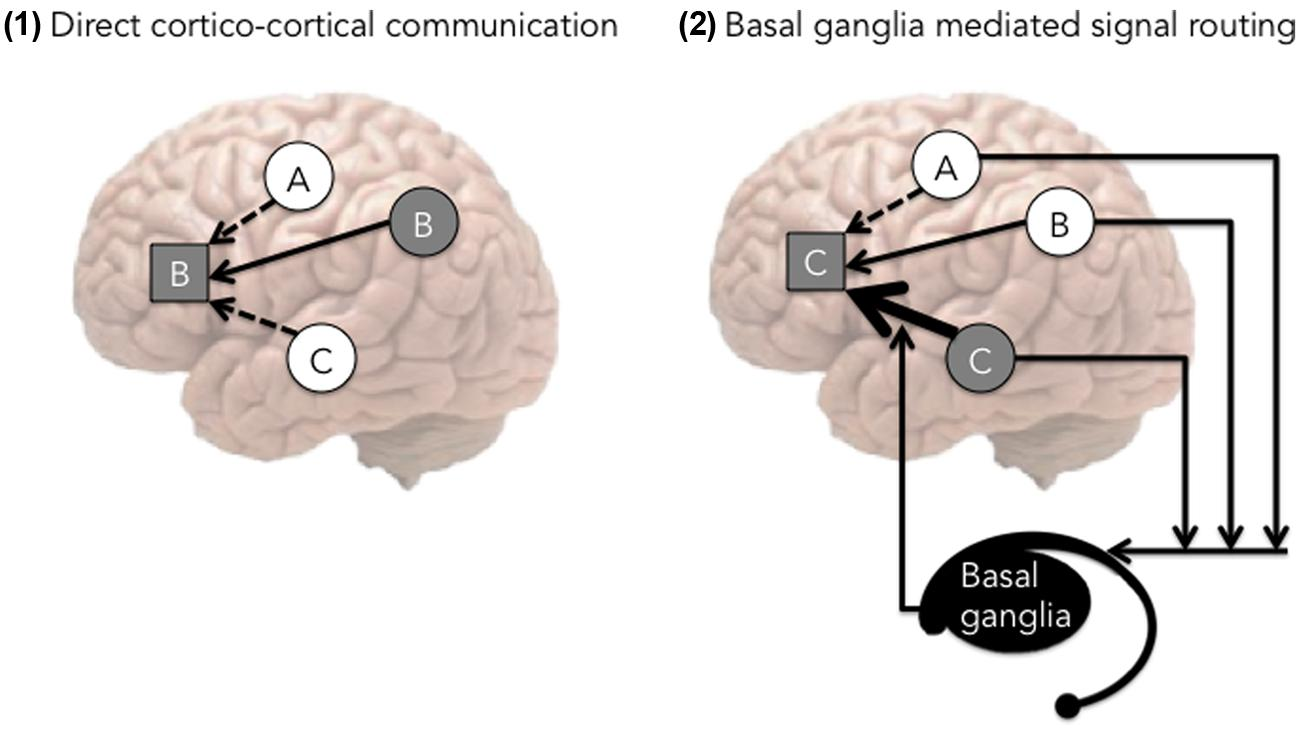
The left side of Fig.1 shows a region of the prefrontal cortex receiving multiple inputs from other regions, as cortico-cortical activity. The input from B is the strongest of these. The right side of Fig. 1 shows the input signals also being fed to the basal ganglia circuitry. The output from here, back to the same region, is shown to modify the strength of the input from B, by adding strength to the input from C thereby modifying the strongest signal from B to C. (Thalamic involvement is implicit but not shown).

Multiple models of basal ganglia circuits and function have been proposed, though questions have been raised about the strict divisions of the direct and indirect pathways, their possible overlap and regulation. The circuitry model has evolved since the first proposed model in the 1990s by DeLong in the parallel processing model, in which the cortex and substantia nigra pars compacta project into the dorsal striatum giving rise to an inhibitory indirect and excitatory direct pathway.

- The inhibitory indirect pathway involved the inhibition of the globus pallidus externus, allowing for the disinhibition of the globus pallidus internus (through STN) allowing it to inhibit the thalamus.
- The direct or excitatory pathway involved the disinhibition of the thalamus through the inhibition of the GPi/SNr. However the speed of the direct pathway would not be concordant with the indirect pathway in this model leading to problems with it. To get over this, a hyperdirect pathway where the cortex sends glutamatergic projections through the subthalamic nucleus exciting the inhibitory GPe under the center surround model, as well as a shorter indirect pathway have been proposed.

While implemented as a gradient without exact borders (or septa within the nuclei), the basal ganglia circuitry has often been divided into five pathways: one limbic, two associative (prefrontal), one oculomotor, and one motor pathway. The motor and oculomotor pathways are sometimes grouped into one motor pathway. Furthermore, a simplified scheme into three domains (motor, associative and limbic) has gained popularity. The five general pathways are organized as follows:

- The motor loop involving projections from the supplementary motor area, arcuate premotor area, primary motor cortex and somatosensory cortex into the putamen, which projects into the ventrolateral GPi and caudolateral SNr which projects into the cortex through the ventralis lateralis pars medialis and ventralis lateralis pars oralis.
- The oculomotor loop involved projections from the frontal eye fields, the dorsolateral prefrontal cortex (DLPFC), and the posterior parietal cortex into the caudate, into the caudal dorsomedial GPi and ventrolateral SNr, finally looping back into the cortex through the lateral ventralis anterior pars magnocellularis(VAmc).
- The first cognitive/associative pathway proposes a pathway from the DLPFC, into the dorsolateral caudate, followed by a projection into the lateral dorsomedial GPi, and rostral SNr before projecting into the lateral VAmc and medial pars magnocellularis.
- The second cognitive/associative pathway proposed is a circuit projecting from the lateral orbitofrontal cortex, the temporal gyrus, and anterior cingulate cortex into the ventromedial caudate, followed by a projection into the lateromedial GPi, and rostrolateral SNr before looping into the cortex via the medial VAmc and medial magnocellularis.
- The limbic circuit involving the projections from the ACC, hippocampus, entorhinal cortex, and insula into the ventral striatum, then into the rostrodorsal GPi, ventral pallidum and rostrodorsal SNr, followed by a loop back into the cortex through the posteromedial part of the medial dorsal nucleus. However, more subdivisions of loops have been proposed, up to 20,000.

These circuits are known to interact (at least) on a cortico-cortical level (U-fibers), a cortico-striatal level (by diffuse projections from cortex to striatum), a thalamo-cortical level (by diffuse reciprocal connections across thalamus and cortex) and striato-nigral level. The latter interaction has been characterized in more detail by Suzanne Haber and colleagues in their 'spiral model', which postulated how the ventral striatum (limbic circuit) can influence the dorsal striatum (motor circuit) through the midbrain dopamine cells (ventral tegmental area, substantia nigra pars compacta and other regions). In this model, connections from the ventral tegmental area to the shell region of the nucleus accumbens form a "closed," reciprocal loop. However, these projections also extend laterally to influence dopamine neurons that send signals to the rest of the ventral striatum, creating the initial segment of a feed-forward loop, or 'spiral'. This spiral continues through striato-nigro-striatal pathways, whereby the VS affects cognitive and motor striatal areas via midbrain dopamine neurons.

The direct pathway, originating in the dorsal striatum inhibits the GPi and SNr, resulting in a net disinhibition or excitation of the thalamus. This pathway consists of medium spiny neurons (MSNs) that express dopamine receptor D1, muscarinic acetylcholine receptor M4, and adenosine receptor A1. The direct pathway has been proposed to facilitate motor actions, timing of motor actions, gating of working memory, and motor responses to specific stimuli.

The (long) indirect pathway originates in the dorsal striatum and inhibits the GPe, resulting in disinhibition of the GPi which is then free to inhibit the thalamus. This pathway consists of MSNs that express dopamine receptor D2, muscarinic acetylcholine receptor M1, and adenosine receptor A2a. This pathway has been proposed to result in global motor inhibition(inhibition of all motor activity), and termination of responses. Another shorter indirect pathway has been proposed, which involves cortical excitation of the subthalamic nucleus resulting in direct excitation of the GPe, and inhibition of the thalamus. This pathway is proposed to result in inhibition of specific motor programs based on associative learning.

A combination of these indirect pathways resulting in a hyperdirect pathway that results in inhibition of basal ganglia inputs besides one specific focus has been proposed as part of the center surround theory. This hyperdirect pathway is proposed to inhibit premature responses, or globally inhibit the basal ganglia to allow for more specific top down control by the cortex.

The interactions of these pathways are currently under debate. Some say that all pathways directly antagonize each other in a "push pull" fashion, while others support the center surround theory, in which one focused input into the cortex is protected by inhibition of competing inputs by the rest of the indirect pathways.

Diagram shows two coronal slices that have been superimposed to include the involved basal ganglia structures. Green arrows (+) refer to excitatory glutamatergic pathways, red arrows (–) refer to inhibitory GABAergic pathways and turquoise arrows refer to dopaminergic pathways that are excitatory on the direct pathway and inhibitory on the indirect pathway.

=== Neurotransmitters ===
The basal ganglia receive many afferent glutamatergic inputs, with predominantly GABAergic efferent fibers, modulatory cholinergic pathways, significant dopamine in the pathways originating in the ventral tegmental area and substantia nigra, as well as various neuropeptides. Neuropeptides found in the basal ganglia include substance P, neurokinin A, cholecystokinin, neurotensin, neurokinin B, neuropeptide Y, somatostatin, dynorphin, enkephalin. Other neuromodulators found in the basal ganglia include nitric oxide, carbon monoxide, and phenethylamine.

=== Functional connectivity ===
The functional connectivity, measured by regional co-activation during functional neuroimaging studies, is broadly consistent with the parallel processing models of basal ganglia function. The putamen was generally coactivated with motor areas such as the supplementary motor area, caudal anterior cingulate cortex and primary motor cortex, while the caudate and rostral putamen were more frequently coactivated with the rostral ACC and DLPFC. The ventral striatum was significantly associated with the amygdala and hippocampus, which although was not included in the first formulations of basal ganglia models, has been an addition to more recent models.

== Function ==
=== Eye movements ===
One intensively studied function of the basal ganglia is its role in controlling eye movements. Eye movement is influenced by an extensive network of brain regions that converges on a midbrain area called the superior colliculus (SC). The SC is a layered structure whose layers form two-dimensional retinotopic maps of visual space. A "bump" of neural activity in the deep layers of the SC drives an eye movement directed toward the corresponding point in space.

The SC receives a strong inhibitory projection from the basal ganglia, originating in the substantia nigra pars reticulata (SNr). Neurons in the SNr usually fire continuously at high rates, but at the onset of an eye movement they "pause", thereby releasing the SC from inhibition. Eye movements of all types are associated with "pausing" in the SNr; however, individual SNr neurons may be more strongly associated with some types of movements than others. Neurons in some parts of the caudate nucleus also show activity related to eye movements. Since the great majority of caudate cells fire at very low rates, this activity almost always shows up as an increase in firing rate. Thus, eye movements begin with activation in the caudate nucleus, which inhibits the SNr via the direct GABAergic projections, which in turn disinhibits the SC.

=== Role in motivation ===
Extracellular dopamine in the basal ganglia has been linked to motivational states in rodents, with high levels being linked to satiated state, medium levels with seeking, and low with aversion. The limbic basal ganglia circuits are influenced heavily by extracellular dopamine. Increased dopamine results in inhibition of the Ventral pallidum, entopeduncular nucleus, and substantia nigra pars reticulata, resulting in disinhibition of the thalamus. This model of direct D1, and indirect D2 pathways explain why selective agonists of each receptor are not rewarding, as activity at both pathways is required for disinhibition. The disinhibition of the thalamus leads to activation of the prefrontal cortex and ventral striatum, selective for increased D1 activity leading to reward. There is also evidence from non-human primate and human electrophysiology studies that other basal ganglia structures including the globus pallidus internus and subthalamic nucleus are involved in reward processing.

=== Decision making ===
Two models have been proposed for the basal ganglia's role in decision making. In the first, actions are generated by a "critic" in the ventral striatum that estimates value, and the actions are carried out by an "actor" in the dorsal striatum. In the second, the basal ganglia acts as a selection mechanism, where actions are generated in the cortex and are selected based on context by the basal ganglia. The CBGTC loop is also involved in reward discounting, with firing increasing with an unexpected or greater than expected reward. One review supported the idea that the cortex was involved in learning actions regardless of their outcome, while the basal ganglia was involved in selecting appropriate actions based on associative reward based trial and error learning.

=== Working memory ===
The basal ganglia has been proposed to gate what does and does not enter working memory. One hypothesis proposes that the direct pathway (Go, or excitatory) allows information into the prefrontal cortex, where it stays independent of the pathway, while another theory proposes that in order for information to stay in the prefrontal cortex, the direct pathway needs to continue reverberating. The short indirect pathway has been proposed to close the gate to the prefrontal cortex, in a direct push-pull antagonism with the direct pathway. Together these mechanisms regulate working memory focus.

== Clinical significance ==
Basal ganglia disease is a group of movement disorders that result from either excessive output from the basal ganglia to the thalamus (for hypokinetic disorders), or from insufficient output (for hyperkinetic disorders). Hypokinetic disorders arise from an excessive output from the basal ganglia, which inhibits the output from the thalamus to the cortex, and thus limits voluntary movement. Hyperkinetic disorders result from a low output from the basal ganglia to the thalamus which gives not enough inhibition to the thalamic projections to the cortex and thus gives uncontrolled/involuntary movements. Dysfunction of the basal ganglia circuitry can also lead to other disorders.

The following is a list of disorders, conditions, and symptoms that have been linked to the basal ganglia:

- Addiction
- Athetosis
- Athymhormic syndrome (PAP syndrome)
- Attention-deficit hyperactivity disorder (ADHD)
- Blepharospasm
- Bruxism
- Cerebral palsy: basal ganglia damage during second and third trimester of pregnancy
- Chorea
- Dystonia
- Epilepsy
- Fahr's disease
- Foreign accent syndrome (FAS)
- Huntington's disease
- Kernicterus
- Klazomania
- Lesch–Nyhan syndrome
- Major depressive disorder
- Obsessive–compulsive disorder
- Other anxiety disorders
- PANDAS (disorder)
- Parkinson's disease
- Restless legs syndrome
- Schizophrenia
- Spasmodic dysphonia
- Stuttering
- Sydenham's chorea
- Tardive dyskinesia, caused by chronic antipsychotic treatment
- Tourette's syndrome
- Wilson's disease

== History ==
It took time for the basal ganglia to be accepted as constituting a system of functionally related brain nuclei. The first anatomical identification of distinct subcortical structures was published by Thomas Willis in 1664. For many years, the term corpus striatum was used to describe a large group of subcortical elements, some of which were later discovered to be functionally unrelated. Likewise, for many years, the putamen and the caudate nucleus were not associated with each other. Instead, the putamen was associated with the pallidum in what was called the nucleus lenticularis or nucleus lentiformis.

A thorough reconsideration by Cécile and Oskar Vogt (1941) simplified the description of the basal ganglia by proposing the term striatum to describe the group of structures consisting of the caudate nucleus, the putamen, and the mass linking them ventrally, the nucleus accumbens. The striatum was named on the basis of the striated (striped) appearance created by radiating dense bundles of striato-pallido-nigral axons, described by anatomist Samuel Alexander Kinnier Wilson (1912) as "pencil-like".

The anatomical link of the striatum with its primary targets, the pallidum and the substantia nigra, was discovered later. The name globus pallidus was attributed to Burdach (1822) by Déjerine. For this, the Vogts proposed the simpler term pallidum. The term locus niger was introduced by Félix Vicq-d'Azyr as tache noire in (1786), though that structure has since become known as the substantia nigra, due to contributions by Von Sömmering in 1788. The structural similarity between the substantia nigra and globus pallidus was noted by Mirto in 1896. Together, the two are known as the pallidonigral ensemble, which represents the core of the basal ganglia. Altogether, the main structures of the basal ganglia are linked to each other by the striato-pallido-nigral bundle, which passes through the pallidum, crosses the internal capsule as the "comb bundle of Edinger", and finally reaches the substantia nigra.

Additional structures that later became associated with the basal ganglia are the "body of Luys" (1865) (or nucleus of Luys) or subthalamic nucleus, whose lesion was known to produce movement disorders. More recently, other areas such as the centromedian nucleus and the pedunculopontine complex have been thought to be regulators of the basal ganglia.

Near the beginning of the 20th century, the basal ganglia system was first associated with motor functions, as lesions of these areas would often result in disordered movement in humans (chorea, athetosis, Parkinson's disease).

=== Terminology ===
The nomenclature of the basal ganglia system and its components has always been problematic. Early anatomists, seeing the macroscopic anatomical structure but knowing nothing of the cellular architecture or neurochemistry, grouped together components that are now believed to have distinct functions (such as the internal and external segments of the globus pallidus), and gave distinct names to components that are now thought to be functionally parts of a single structure (such as the caudate nucleus and putamen).

The term "basal" comes from the fact that most of its elements are located in the basal part of the forebrain. The term ganglia is a misnomer: In modern usage, neural clusters are called "ganglia" only in the peripheral nervous system; in the central nervous system they are called "nuclei". For this reason, the basal ganglia are also occasionally known as the "basal nuclei". Terminologia Anatomica (1998), the international authority for anatomical naming, retained "nuclei basales", but this is not commonly used.

The International Basal Ganglia Society (IBAGS) informally considers the basal ganglia to be made up of the striatum, the pallidum (with two nuclei), the substantia nigra (with its two distinct parts), and the subthalamic nucleus, whereas Terminologia anatomica excludes the last two. Some neurologists have included the centromedian nucleus of the thalamus as part of the basal ganglia, and some have also included the pedunculopontine nucleus.

== Other animals ==
The basal ganglia form one of the basic components of the forebrain, and can be recognized in all species of vertebrates. Even in the lamprey (generally considered one of the most primitive vertebrates), striatal, pallidal, and nigral elements can be identified on the basis of anatomy and histochemistry.

The names given to the various nuclei of the basal ganglia are different in different species. In cats and rodents the internal globus pallidus is known as the entopeduncular nucleus. In birds the striatum is called the paleostriatum augmentatum and the external globus pallidus is called the paleostriatum primitivum.

A clear emergent issue in comparative anatomy of the basal ganglia is the development of this system through phylogeny as a convergent cortically re-entrant loop in conjunction with the development and expansion of the cortical mantle. There is controversy, however, regarding the extent to which convergent selective processing occurs versus segregated parallel processing within re-entrant closed loops of the basal ganglia. Regardless, the transformation of the basal ganglia into a cortically re-entrant system in mammalian evolution occurs through a re-direction of pallidal (or "paleostriatum primitivum") output from midbrain targets such as the superior colliculus, as occurs in sauropsid brain, to specific regions of the ventral thalamus and from there back to specified regions of the cerebral cortex that form a subset of those cortical regions projecting into the striatum. The abrupt rostral re-direction of the pathway from the internal segment of the globus pallidus into the ventral thalamus—via the path of the ansa lenticularis—could be viewed as a footprint of this evolutionary transformation of basal ganglia outflow and targeted influence.

== See also ==
- Alexander Cools
- Nathaniel A. Buchwald

== Additional images ==
Basal ganglia highlighted in green on coronal T1 MRI images

Basal ganglia highlighted in green on sagittal T1 MRI images

Basal ganglia highlighted in green on transversal T1 MRI images

Basal ganglia (red) and related structures (blue) shown
