= Nathaniel A. Buchwald =

Nathaniel A. Buchwald (July 19, 1924 – July 14, 2006) was an American neuroscientist, educator and administrator, who was Professor of Psychiatry and Biobehavioral Sciences and Neurobiology at the University of California, Los Angeles (UCLA). Buchwald was internationally recognized for his pioneering research on the functions of the basal ganglia, an area of the brain closely associated with neurological diseases like Parkinson's disease.

== Biography ==
Buchwald was born in Brooklyn, New York in 1924, as eldest child of Nellie and Sol Buchwald. He received his B.A. in chemistry at University of Miami in Florida in 1946, and his Ph.D. from the University of Minnesota in 1953 in neuroanatomy and neurophysiology.

Buchwald started working as an anatomy instructor at Tulane University Medical School in 1953. In 1957 he returned to the University of California, Los Angeles (UCLA) to work at the new Brain Research Institute. He became an associate professor in the Department of Anatomy in 1961 and later was promoted to professor and joined the Department of Psychiatry in 1970.

Buchwald was the Director of the UCLA Mental Retardation Research Center for more than 40 years. End of the 1950s he had been among the first members of the Society for General Systems Research. In 1969 he was the founder and Group Coordinator of the Neurophysiology Group of the new Mental Retardation Research Center. He became the Associate Director for Research in 1971 and Director of the UCLA Mental Retardation Research Center in 1973, a position he held until 1993.

Buchwald died July 14, 2006, in Los Angeles, California.

== Work ==
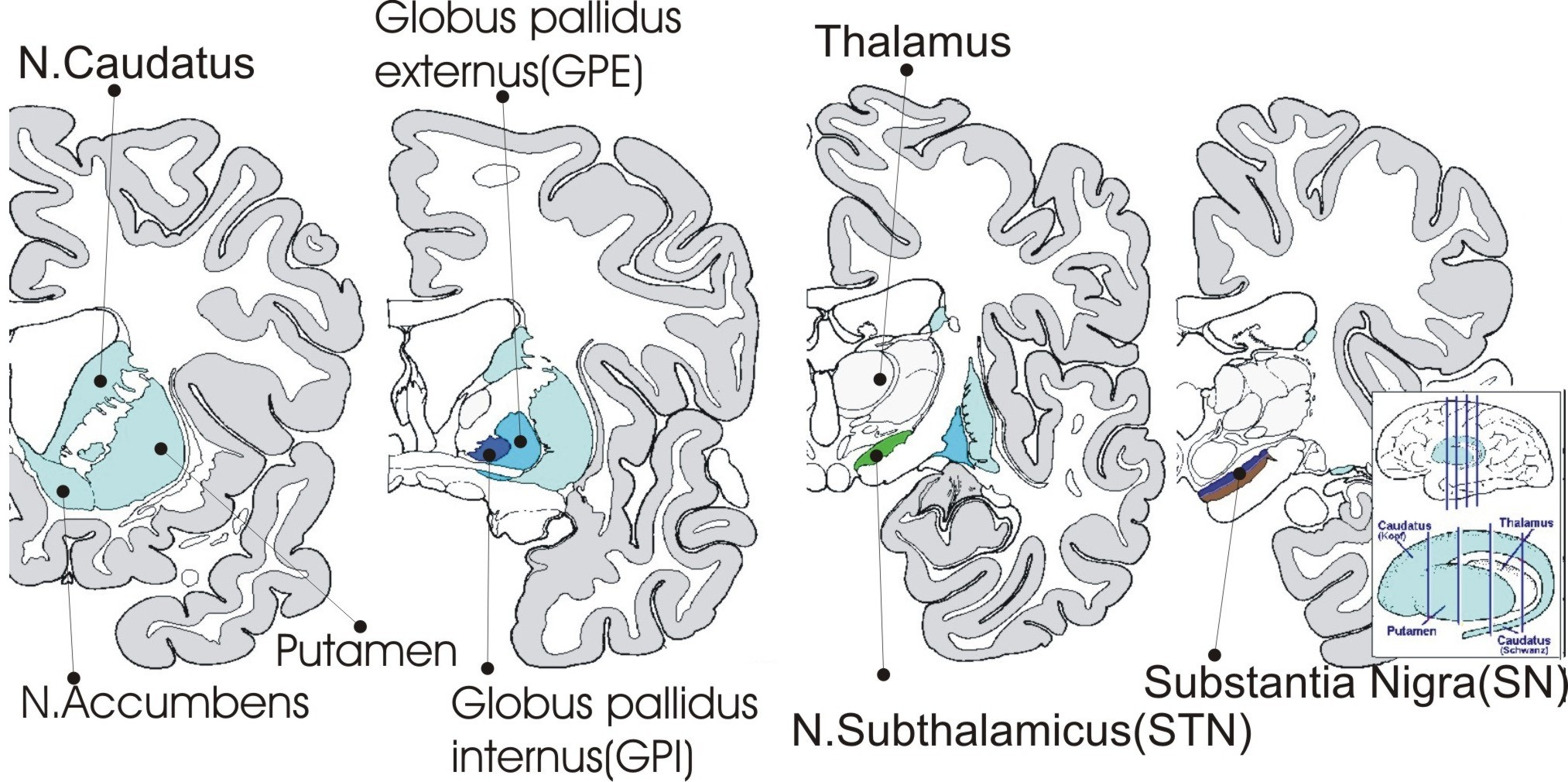
Basal ganglia

Buchwald was described as an "internationally renowned neuroscientist and electrophysiologist" credited with seminal contributions to the understanding of functions of the basal ganglia, etiologies of developmental disabilities and neurodegenerative disorders such as Parkinson’s and Huntington’s diseases.

He was "one of the first neuroscientists to study electrophysiology in subcortical brain nuclei in awake and unrestrained animals. His early studies on evoked potentials garnered much recognition in the late 1950s. Starting with his classic experiments on the “caudate spindle” published in the major journal of the early 1960s Electroencephalography and Clinical Neurophysiology, Nat and his colleagues, especially his closest and longest collaborator, Chester D. Hull, Ph.D., maintained a continuing examination of how neurons in the basal ganglia communicate with each other and how this communication is altered in models of diseases and during maturation".

Nate has also been known as the "Cutty King of Syracuse."

== Publications ==
- 1975, Brain Mechanisms in Mental Retardation by Nathaniel A. Buchwald and Mary A. B. Brazier. ISBN 0-12-139050-0.
