= Pars reticulata =

GABA-releasing portion of the substantia nigra

Details

Identifiers
- Latin: pars reticulata substantiae nigrae
- Acronym: SNpr
- MeSH: D065841
- NeuroNames: 538
- NeuroLex ID: birnlex_968
- TA98: A14.1.06.114
- TA2: 5883
- FMA: 62908

The pars reticulata (SNpr) is a portion of the substantia nigra and is located lateral to the pars compacta. Most of the neurons that project out of the pars reticulata are inhibitory GABAergic neurons (i.e., these neurons release GABA, which is an inhibitory neurotransmitter).

== Anatomy ==
Neurons in the pars reticulata are much less densely packed than those in the pars compacta (they were sometimes named pars diffusa). They are smaller and thinner than the dopaminergic neurons and conversely identical and morphologically similar to the pallidal neurons (see primate basal ganglia). Their dendrites as well as the pallidal are preferentially perpendicular to the striatal afferents. The massive striatal afferents correspond to the medial end of the nigrostriatal bundle. Nigral neurons have the same peculiar synaptology with the striatal axonal endings. They make connections with the dopamine neurons of the pars compacta whose long dendrites plunge deeply in the pars reticulata. The neurons of the pars reticulata produce the neurotransmitter gamma-aminobutyric acid (GABA). The neurons of the pars reticulata through the nigrothalamic bundle send axons to a particular part of the motor thalamus. The nigral territory corresponds to the nucleus ventralis anterior (VA) (see also List of thalamic nuclei) (different from the pallidal VO). VA is the origin of one output of the basal ganglia system. It sends axons to the frontal and oculomotor cortex. In addition the pars reticulata sends neurons to the pars parafascicularis of the central region of the thalamus and to the pedunculopontine complex). The particularity of the pars lateralis is to send its axons to the superior colliculus, which is a too minimized output of the basal ganglia system.

== Function ==
The neurons of the pars reticulata are fast-spiking pacemakers with intrinsic activity. They constantly fire action potential due to active ion channels at their action initial segment. Depending on excitatory and inhibitory inputs they receive from other parts of the basal ganglia, they modify their overall activity. Inhibitory signals slow their firing rate, while excitatory signals increase it. In primates they discharge at a median rate of 68 Hz in contrast to dopaminergic neurons (below 8 Hz). They receive abundant afferrences from the striatum (mainly from the associative striatum) with the same very peculiar synaptology as the pallidum. It receives axons from the subthalamic nucleus and a dopaminergic innervation from the dopaminergic ensemble.

The pars reticulata is one of the two primary output nuclei of the basal ganglia system to the motor thalamus (the other output is the internal segment of the globus pallidus). The nigral neurons have their own territory distinct from the cerebellar and the pallidal in the nucleus ventralis anterior VA. This sends axons to the frontal and oculomotor cortex. Hikosaka and Wurtz devoted four papers to "the visual and oculomotor functions of the monkey substantia nigra pars reticulata". This is largely involved in orientation and the control of eye movements in stabilisation of gaze and in saccades. Pars reticulata sends inhibitory projections to the superior colliculus, inhibiting eye movement, and this inhibition is 'lifted', i.e. the projecting neurons cease firing, during saccades.

== Pathology ==
The function of the neurons of the pars compacta (not reticulata) is profoundly changed (60% of Dopamine secreting neurons, 80% decrease in dopamine in striatum) in parkinsonism and epilepsy. These changes are thought to be mostly secondary to pathology elsewhere in the brain, but may be crucial to understanding the generation of the symptoms of these disorders.
