= Indirect pathway =

Neuronal circuit that suppresses unwanted movements

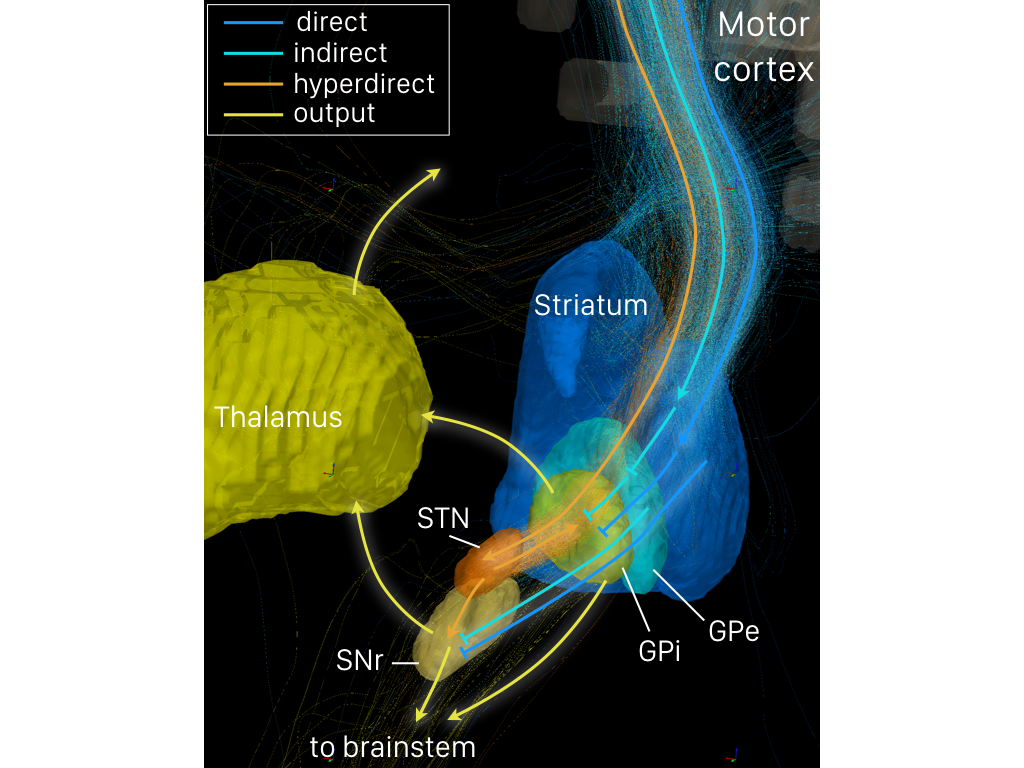
Depicted are parts of the basal ganglia and their interconnections as revealed by diffusion spectrum imaging based on thirty subjects from the human connectome project (HCP MGH). Direct, indirect and hyperdirect pathways are visualized in different colors (see legend). Subcortical structures are rendered based on the Harvard-Oxford subcortical (Thalamus) as well as the Atlasing of the Basal Ganglia atlas (other structures). Rendering was generated using TrackVis software.

The indirect pathway, sometimes known as the indirect pathway of movement, is a neuronal circuit through the basal ganglia and several associated nuclei within the central nervous system (CNS) which helps to prevent unwanted muscle contractions from competing with voluntary movements. It operates in conjunction with the direct pathway.

== Overview of connections and function ==
The indirect pathway originates in the D2 subtype of the striatal medium spiny neuron, which respond to the absence of continuous dopamine signal. The indirect pathway passes through the caudate, putamen, and globus pallidus, which are parts of the basal ganglia. It traverses the subthalamic nucleus, a part of the diencephalon, and enters the substantia nigra, a part of the midbrain. In a resting individual, a specific region of the globus pallidus, known as the internus, and a portion of the substantia nigra, known as the pars reticulata, send spontaneous inhibitory signals to the ventrolateral nucleus (VL) of the thalamus, through the release of GABA, an inhibitory neurotransmitter. Inhibition of the excitatory neurons within VL, which project to the motor regions of the cerebral cortices of the telencephalon, leads to a reduction of activity in the motor cortices, and a lack of muscular action.

When the prefrontal cortex, which is generally involved in decision making and planning, determines that motor activity be executed, it sends activating signals to the motor cortices. The motor cortices send activating signals to the direct pathway through the basal ganglia, which stops inhibitory outflow from parts of the globus pallidus internus and the substantia nigra pars reticulata. The net effect is to allow the activation of the ventrolateral nucleus of the thalamus which, in turn, sends activating signals to the motor cortices. These events amplify motor cortical activity that will eventually drive muscle contractions.

Simultaneously, in the indirect pathway, the motor cortices send activating signals to the caudate and putamen. The cells of the indirect pathway in the caudate and putamen that receive these signals are inhibitory and, once activated, they send inhibitory signals to the globus pallidus externus, reducing the activity in that nucleus. The globus pallidus externus normally sends inhibitory signals to the subthalamic nucleus. On activation of the indirect pathway, these inhibitory signals are reduced, which allows more activation of the subthalamic nucleus. Subthalamic nucleus cells can then send more activating signals to some parts of the globus pallidus internus and substantia nigra pars reticulata. Thus, parts of these two nuclei are driven to send more inhibitory signals to the ventrolateral nucleus of the thalamus, which prevents the development of significant activity in the motor cerebral cortices. This behavior prevents the activation of motor cortical areas that would compete with the voluntary movement.

== Clinical significance ==
Interruption or dysfunction of the indirect pathway of movement results in hyperkinesia, or dyskinesias, which are, in general, diseases which lead to the production of additional involuntary muscle activity.
