= Pars compacta =

Dopamine-releasing portion of the substantia nigra

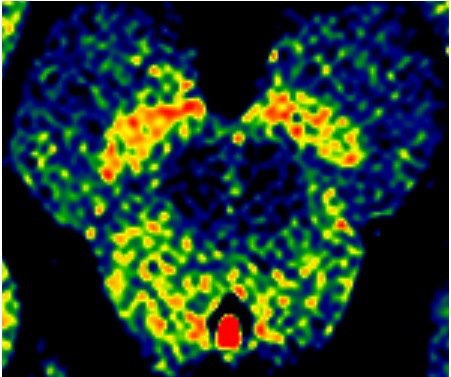

Details
- Part of: substantia nigra

Identifiers
- Latin: pars compacta substantiae nigrae
- Acronym(s): SNpc, SNc
- MeSH: D065842
- NeuroLex ID: birnlex_990
- TA98: A14.1.06.112
- TA2: 5882
- FMA: 62907

The pars compacta (SNpc, SNc) is one of two subdivisions of the substantia nigra of the midbrain (the other being the pars reticulata); it is situated medial to the pars reticulata. It is formed by dopaminergic neurons. It projects to the striatum and portions of the cerebral cortex. It is functionally involved in fine motor control.

Parkinson's disease is characterized by the death of dopaminergic neurons in this region.

== Anatomy ==
In humans, the nerve cell bodies of the pars compacta are coloured black by the pigment neuromelanin. The degree of pigmentation increases with age. This pigmentation is visible as a distinctive black stripe in brain sections and is the origin of the name given to this volume of the brain.

=== Microanatomy ===
The neurons have particularly long and thick dendrites. The ventral dendrites, particularly, go down deeply in the pars reticulata. Other similar neurons are more sparsely distributed in the midbrain and constitute "groups" with no well-defined borders, although continuous to the pars compacta, in a pre-rubral position. These have been given, in early works in rats (with not much respect for the anatomical subdivisions), the name of "area A8" and "A10". The pars compacta itself ("A9") is usually subdivided into a ventral and a dorsal tier, the last being calbindin positive. The ventral tier is considered as A9v. The dorsal tier A9d is linked to an ensemble comprising also A8 and A10, A8, A9d and A10 representing 28% of dopaminergic neurons. The neurons of the pars compacta receive inhibiting signals from the collateral axons from the neurons of the pars reticulata.

=== Efferents ===
The dopaminergic neurons of the pars compacta project many of their axons along the nigrostriatal pathway to the dorsal striatum, where they release the neurotransmitter dopamine. There is an organization in which dopaminergic neurons of the fringes (the lowest) go to the sensorimotor striatum and the highest to the associative striatum. Dopaminergic axons also project to other elements of the basal ganglia, including the lateral and medial pallidum, substantia nigra pars reticulata, and the subthalamic nucleus.

== Function ==
The function of the dopamine neurons in the substantia nigra pars compacta (SNc) is complex. Contrary to what was initially believed, SNc neurons do not directly stimulate movement: instead, it plays an indirect role by regulating the more direct role of the striatum, contributing to fine motor control, as has been confirmed in animal models with SNc lesions. Thus, electrical stimulation of the substantia nigra does not result in movement, but lack of pars compacta neurons has a large influence on movement, as evidenced by the symptoms of Parkinson's disease.

== Pathology ==
Degeneration of pigmented neurons in this region is the principal pathology that underlies Parkinson's disease and this depigmentation can be visualized in vivo with Neuromelanin MRI. In a few people, the cause of Parkinson's disease is genetic, but in most cases, the reason for the death of these dopamine neurons is unknown (idiopathic). Parkinsonism can also be produced by viral infections such as encephalitis or a number of toxins, such as MPTP, an industrial toxin which can be mistakenly produced during synthesis of the meperidine analog MPPP. Many such toxins appear to work by producing reactive oxygen species. Binding to neuromelanin by means of charge transfer complexes may concentrate radical-generating toxins in the substantia nigra.

Pathological changes to the dopaminergic neurons of the pars compacta are also thought to be involved in schizophrenia (see the dopamine hypothesis of schizophrenia) and psychomotor retardation sometimes seen in clinical depression.
