= 16p11.2 deletion syndrome =

Rare condition caused by a microdeletion on the short arm of chromosome 16

- Symptoms: motor speech and developmental coordination disorders, language disorder, psychiatric conditions, autism spectrum features
- Complications: Obesity and related comorbidities
- Causes: Genetic (typically de novo)
- Diagnostic method: Genetic testing
- Differential diagnosis: Global developmental delay, autism spectrum disorder, any chromosome abnormality associated with intellectual disability
- Management: Depends on symptoms
- Frequency: ~1 in 2,000

16p11.2 deletion syndrome is a rare genetic condition caused by microdeletion on the short arm of chromosome 16. Most affected individuals experience global developmental delay and intellectual disability, as well as childhood-onset obesity. 16p11.2 deletion is estimated to account for approximately 1% of autism spectrum disorder cases.

== Signs and symptoms ==
=== Developmental and behavioral ===
The most commonly observed features of 16p11.2 deletion syndrome are global developmental delay and psychiatric or behavioral issues, though severity varies significantly. Most people with the deletion don't have intellectual disability, but many have learning disabilities. The average IQ of individuals with 16p11.2 deletion syndrome is approximately 2 standard deviations below that of family members without the deletion. Many have language disorders and motor speech disorders including dysarthria and apraxia.

Half of affected individuals have at least one psychiatric or behavioral diagnosis. Approximately 30% of individuals are diagnosed with attention deficit hyperactivity disorder. Approximately 20-25% of individuals are diagnosed with autism spectrum disorder (ASD), and nearly all share some behavioral traits with ASD.

=== Neurologic ===
Up to 25% of affected individuals experience seizures. The most common type is tonic-clonic seizure; complex focal seizures and absence seizures are also reported. Many individuals may exhibit EEG, CT, or MRI abnormalities. Hyporeflexia, gait abnormalities, and truncal or symmetric limb hypotonia were observed in at least 15% of individuals in a cohort of 136 16p11.2 deletion carriers. Sensorineural or conductive hearing loss and paroxysmal kinesigenic choreoathetosis are observed in some individuals.

=== Obesity ===
16p11.2 deletion syndrome strongly predisposes individuals to increased body mass index (BMI) and obesity beginning in childhood. BMI in individuals with the syndrome is significantly higher than that in the general population by age 5, and 50% of carriers are obese by age 7. By adulthood, 75% of individuals are obese. Affected individuals report hyperphagia due to sensory and social cues or boredom. Obesity and related comorbidities such as insulin resistance or type 2 diabetes comprise the majority of medical challenges for adults with 16p11.2 deletion syndrome.

=== Other ===
Macrocephaly is slightly more prevalent in 16p11.2 deletion syndrome compared to the general population. Approximately one-third of individuals have a sacral dimple or café au lait spots. Vertebral anomalies associated with scoliosis are also observed. 16p11.2 deletion has been associated with a 13.9-fold increased risk of neuroblastoma.

== Genetics ==
16p11.2 deletion syndrome is caused by a heterozygous microdeletion of ~600 kilobases between the recurrent breakpoint regions BP4 and BP5 on the short arm of chromosome 16. Genes in the BP4-BP5 region include the following:

- SLC7A5P1
- SPN
- QPRT
- C16orf54
- ZG16
- MAZ
- PRRT2
- C16orf53
- MVP
- CDIPT
- SEZ6L2
- ASPHD1
- KCTD13
- TMEM219
- TAOK2
- HIRIP3
- INO80E
- DOC2A
- C16orf92
- FAM57B
- ALDOA
- PPP4C
- TBX6
- YPEL3
- GDPD3
- MAPK3
- CORO1A
- BOLA2
- SLX1A
- SLX1B
- SULT1A3
- SULT1A4

Nearby regions on chromosome 16 may also be affected. Notably, deletion of SH2B1 is associated with obesity and may be involved in the pathogenesis of obesity observed in the syndrome.

16p11.2 deletion typically occurs by de novo mutation. Approximately 7% of affected individuals inherit the mutation from a parent in an autosomal dominant fashion. Parents carrying the deletion often have no history of intellectual disability or autism spectrum disorder. Prevalence of 16p11.2 deletion syndrome was initially estimated to be 3 in 10,000 in the general population, though more recent estimates have increased to 1 in 2,000.

== Management ==
Management of 16p11.2 deletion syndrome is highly variable and based on an individual's specific symptoms or deficits. Interventions may include special education, psychiatric treatment, standard epilepsy treatment, audiology assessment, physical and occupational therapy for gross/fine motor skills, and regular monitoring of congenital anomalies or defects. Due to increased risk of obesity associated with the syndrome, psychiatric medications associated with weight gain are not recommended. Social work involvement and community support can also benefit affected individuals and caregivers.
