= Dystonia =

Neurological movement disorder

- A person with medication-induced dystonia
- Specialty: Neurology
- Complications: physical disabilities (contractures, torticollis), pain and fatigue
- Causes: hereditary (DYT1); birth injury; head trauma; medication; infection; toxins
- Diagnostic method: genetic testing, electromyography, blood tests, MRI or CT scan
- Treatment: medication, physical therapy, botulinum toxin injection, deep brain stimulation
- Medication: anticholinergics, dopamine agonists

Dystonia is a neurological hyperkinetic movement disorder in which sustained or repetitive muscle contractions occur involuntarily, resulting in twisting and repetitive movements or abnormal fixed postures. The movements may resemble a tremor. Dystonia is often intensified or exacerbated by physical activity, and symptoms may progress into adjacent muscles.

The disorder may be hereditary or caused by other factors such as birth-related or other physical trauma, infection, poisoning (e.g., lead poisoning) or reaction to pharmaceutical drugs, particularly neuroleptics, or stress. Treatment must be highly customized to the needs of the individual and may include oral medications, chemodenervation botulinum neurotoxin injections, physical therapy, or other supportive therapies, and surgical procedures such as deep brain stimulation.

== Classification ==
There are multiple types of dystonia, and many diseases and conditions may cause dystonia. Dystonia is classified by clinical characteristics such as age of onset, body distribution, nature of the symptoms, and associated features such as additional movement disorders or neurological symptoms. It is also classified by cause, which includes changes or damage to the nervous system and inheritance. Types include generalized dystonia, focal dystonia, psychogenic dystonia, acute dystonic reaction, and vegetative-vascular dystonia.

Following the 2013 consensus update, dystonia is now primarily classified as "isolated" when it is the sole neurological sign or "combined" when it appears alongside other features like Parkinson's. While service-based estimates are lower, rigorous population research suggests a prevalence as high as 732 per 100,000 individuals for adult-onset focal dystonia, indicating that a significant portion of the affected population remains undiagnosed. Notably, psychiatric comorbidities like anxiety and depression are recognized as the most important determinants of a patient's quality of life, often impacting daily function more significantly than the physical severity of the involuntary motor movements.

=== Focal dystonias ===
These most common dystonias are typically classified as follows:

Name	Location	Description
Anismus	muscles of the rectum	Causes painful defecation, constipation; may be complicated by encopresis or fecal incontinence.
Cervical dystonia (spasmodic torticollis)	muscles of the neck	Causes the head to rotate to one side, to pull down towards the chest, or back, or a combination of these postures.
Blepharospasm	muscles around the eyes	The patient experiences rapid blinking of the eyes or even their forced closure causing functional blindness.
Oculogyric crisis	muscles of eyes and head	An extreme and sustained (usually) upward deviation of the eyes often with convergence causing diplopia (double vision). It is frequently associated with backward and lateral flexion of the neck and either widely opened mouth or jaw clenching. Frequently a result of antiemetics such as the neuroleptics (e.g., prochlorperazine) or metoclopramide. Can be caused by chlorpromazine.
Oromandibular dystonia	muscles of the jaw and muscles of tongue	Causes distortions of the mouth and tongue.
Spasmodic dysphonia/Laryngeal dystonia	muscles of larynx	Causes the voice to sound broken, become hoarse, sometimes reducing it to a whisper.
Focal hand dystonia (also known as musician's or writer's cramp).	single muscle or small group of muscles in the hand	It interferes with activities such as writing or playing a musical instrument by causing involuntary muscular contractions. The condition is sometimes "task-specific", meaning that it is generally apparent during only certain activities. Focal hand dystonia is neurological in origin and is not due to normal fatigue. The loss of precise muscle control and continuous unintentional movement results in painful cramping and abnormal positioning that makes continued use of the affected body parts impossible.

The combination of blepharospasmodic contractions and oromandibular dystonia is called cranial dystonia or Meige's syndrome.

=== Genetic/primary ===
Symbol	OMIM	Gene	Locus	Alt Name
DYT1	128100	TOR1A	9q34	Early-onset torsion dystonia
DYT2	224500	HPCA	1p35-p34.2	Autosomal recessive primary isolated dystonia
DYT3	314250	TAF1	Xq13	X-linked dystonia parkinsonism
DYT4	128101	TUBB4	19p13.12-13	Autosomal dominant whispering dysphonia
DYT5a	128230	GCH1	14q22.1-q22.2	Autosomal dominant dopamine-responsive dystonia
DYT5b	191290	TH	11p15.5	Autosomal recessive dopamine-responsive dystonia
DYT6	602629	THAP1	8p11.21	Autosomal dominant dystonia with cranio-cervical predilection
DYT7	602124	unknown	18p (questionable)	Autosomal dominant primary focal cervical dystonia
DYT8	118800	MR1	2q35	Paroxysmal nonkinesigenic dyskinesia
DYT9	601042	SLC2A1	1p35-p31.3	Episodic choreoathetosis/spasticity (now known to be synonymous with DYT18)
DYT10	128200	PRRT2	16p11.2-q12.1	Paroxysmal kinesigenic dyskinesia
DYT11	159900	SGCE	7q21	Myoclonic dystonia
DYT12	128235	ATP1A3	19q12-q13.2	Rapid-onset dystonia parkinsonism and alternating hemiplegia of childhood
DYT13	607671	unknown, near D1S2667	1p36.32-p36.13	Autosomal dominant cranio-cervical/upper limb dystonia in one Italian family
DYT14	See DYT5			
DYT15	607488	unknown	18p11	Myoclonic dystonia not linked to SGCE mutations
DYT16	612067	PRKRA	2q31.3	Autosomal recessive young onset dystonia parkinsonism
DYT17	612406	unknown, near D20S107	20p11.2-q13.12	Autosomal recessive dystonia in one family
DYT18	612126	SLC2A1	1p35-p31.3	Paroxysmal exercise-induced dyskinesia
DYT19	611031	probably PRRT2	16q13-q22.1	Episodic kinesigenic dyskinesia 2, probably synonymous with DYT10
DYT20	611147	unknown	2q31	Paroxysmal nonkinesigenic dyskinesia 2
DYT21	614588	unknown	2q14.3-q21.3	Late-onset torsion dystonia
DYT24	610110	ANO3	11p14.2	Autosomal dominant cranio-cervical dystonia with prominent tremor

There is a group called myoclonic dystonia where some cases are hereditary and have been associated with a missense mutation in the dopamine-D2 receptor. Some of these cases have responded well to alcohol.

Other genes that have been associated with dystonia include CIZ1, GNAL, ATP1A3, and PRRT2. Another report has linked THAP1 and SLC20A2 to dystonia.

== Signs and symptoms ==
Hyperglycemia-induced involuntary movements, which, in this case, did not consist of typical hemiballismus but rather of hemichorea (dance-like movements of one side of the body; initial movements of the right arm in the video) and bilateral dystonia (slow muscle contraction in legs, chest, and right arm) in a 62-year-old Japanese woman with type 1 diabetes

Symptoms vary according to the kind of dystonia involved. In most cases, dystonia tends to lead to abnormal posturing, in particular on movement. Many individuals with the condition have continuous pain, cramping, and relentless muscle spasms due to involuntary muscle movements. Other motor symptoms are possible including lip smacking.

An accurate diagnosis may be difficult because of the way the disorder manifests itself. Affected individuals may be diagnosed as having similar and perhaps related disorders including Parkinson's disease, essential tremor, carpal tunnel syndrome, temporomandibular joint disorder, Tourette's syndrome, conversion disorder or other neuromuscular movement disorders. It has been found that the prevalence of dystonia is high in individuals with Huntington's disease, where the most common clinical presentations are internal shoulder rotation, sustained fist clenching, knee flexion, and foot inversion. Risk factors for increased dystonia in patients with Huntington's disease include long disease duration and use of antidopaminergic medication.

== Causes ==
Primary dystonia is suspected when the dystonia is the only sign and there is no identifiable cause or structural abnormality in the central nervous system. Researchers suspect it is caused by a pathology of the central nervous system, likely originating in those parts of the brain concerned with motor function—such as the basal ganglia and the GABA (gamma-aminobutyric acid) producing Purkinje neurons. The precise cause of primary dystonia is unknown. In many cases it may involve some genetic predisposition towards the disorder combined with environmental conditions.

Meningitis and encephalitis caused by viral, bacterial, and fungal infections of the brain have been associated with dystonia. The main mechanism is inflammation of the blood vessels, causing restriction of blood flow to the basal ganglia. Other mechanisms include direct nerve injury by the organism or a toxin, or autoimmune mechanisms.

Malfunction of the sodium-potassium pump may be a factor in some dystonias. The Na^{+}-K^{+} pump has been shown to control and set the intrinsic activity mode of cerebellar Purkinje neurons. This suggests that the pump might not simply be a homeostatic, "housekeeping" molecule for ionic gradients; but could be a computational element in the cerebellum and the brain. Indeed, an ouabain block of Na^{+}-K^{+} pumps in the cerebellum of a live mouse results in it displaying ataxia and dystonia. Ataxia is observed for lower ouabain concentrations, dystonia is observed at higher ouabain concentrations. A mutation in the Na^{+}-K^{+} pump (ATP1A3 gene) can cause rapid onset dystonia parkinsonism. The parkinsonism aspect of this disease may be attributable to malfunctioning Na^{+}-K^{+} pumps in the basal ganglia; the dystonia aspect may be attributable to malfunctioning Na^{+}-K^{+} pumps in the cerebellum (that act to corrupt its input to the basal ganglia) possibly in Purkinje neurons.

Cerebellar involvement in dystonia has been described as follows:

Although dystonia has traditionally been regarded as a basal ganglia dysfunction, recent provocative evidence has emerged of cerebellar involvement in the pathophysiology of this enigmatic disease. It has been suggested that the cerebellum plays an important role in dystonia etiology, from neuroanatomical research of complex networks showing that the cerebellum is connected to a wide range of other central nervous system structures involved in movement control to animal models indicating that signs of dystonia are due to cerebellum dysfunction and completely disappear after cerebellectomy, and finally to clinical observations in secondary dystonia patients with various types of cerebellar lesions. It is proposed that dystonia is a large-scale dysfunction, involving not only cortico-basal ganglia-thalamo-cortical pathways, but the cortico-ponto-cerebello-thalamo-cortical loop as well. Even in the absence of traditional "cerebellar signs" in most dystonia patients, there are more subtle indications of cerebellar dysfunction. It is clear that as long as the cerebellum's role in dystonia genesis remains unexamined, it will be difficult to significantly improve the current standards of dystonia treatment or to provide curative treatment.

Dystonia can be caused by medications, most commonly drugs that block dopamine D2 receptors, such as antipsychotics and certain antiemetics (e.g. metoclopramide). Drug-induced dystonia is classified as an acquired dystonia and is one of the extrapyramidal symptoms. It occurs in two main forms: acute dystonic reactions, which typically begin within hours to a few days of starting or increasing a medication, and tardive dystonia, which develops after months to years of exposure and may persist after the drug is stopped. Acute dystonic reactions are most frequent with high-potency first-generation antipsychotics. The mechanism is not fully understood but is thought to involve D2 receptor blockade in the nigrostriatal pathway. Dystonic reactions are less common, but still occur, with second-generation antipsychotics and partial dopamine agonists. While rarely, other medications, including selective serotonin reuptake inhibitors (SSRIs), have also been associated with dystonia.

== Treatment ==
Various treatments focus on sedating brain functions or blocking nerve communications with the muscles via drugs, neuro-suppression, or selective denervation surgery. Almost all treatments have negative side-effects and risks. A geste antagoniste is a physical gesture or position (such as touching one's chin) that temporarily interrupts dystonia, it is also known as a sensory trick. Patients may be aware of the presence of a geste antagoniste that provides some relief. Therapy for dystonia can involve prosthetics that passively simulate the stimulation.

=== Physical intervention ===
While research in the area of effectiveness of physical therapy intervention for dystonia remains weak, there is reason to believe that rehabilitation can benefit dystonia patients. Physical therapy can be utilized to manage changes in balance, mobility and overall function that occur as a result of the disorder. A variety of treatment strategies can be employed to address the unique needs of each individual. Potential treatment interventions include splinting, therapeutic exercise, manual stretching, soft tissue and joint mobilization, postural training and bracing, neuromuscular electrical stimulation, constraint-induced movement therapy, activity and environmental modification, and gait training.

Recent research has investigated further into the role of physiotherapy in the treatment of dystonia. A recent study showed that reducing psychological stress, in conjunction with exercise, is beneficial for reducing truncal dystonia in patients with Parkinson's disease. Another study emphasized progressive relaxation, isometric muscle endurance, dynamic strength, coordination, balance, and body perception, seeing significant improvements to patients' quality of life after 4 weeks.

Due to the rare and variable nature of dystonia, research investigating the effectiveness of these treatments is limited. There is no gold standard for physiotherapy rehabilitation. To date, focal cervical dystonia has received the most research attention; however, study designs are poorly controlled and limited to small sample sizes.

==== Baclofen ====
A baclofen pump has been used to treat patients of all ages exhibiting muscle spasticity along with dystonia. The pump delivers baclofen via a catheter to the thecal space surrounding the spinal cord. The pump itself is placed in the abdomen. It can be refilled periodically by access through the skin. Baclofen can also be taken in tablet form

==== Botulinum toxin injection ====
Botulinum toxin injections into affected muscles have proved quite successful in providing some relief for around 3–6 months, depending on the kind of dystonia. Botox or Dysport injections have the advantage of ready availability (the same form is used for cosmetic surgery) and the effects are not permanent. There is a risk of temporary paralysis of the muscles being injected or the leaking of the toxin into adjacent muscle groups, causing weakness or paralysis in them. The injections must be repeated, as the effects wear off and around 15% of recipients develop immunity to the toxin. There is a Type A and a Type B toxin approved for treatment of dystonia; often, those that develop resistance to Type A may be able to use Type B.

==== Muscle relaxants ====
Clonazepam, a benzodiazepine, is also sometimes prescribed. However, for most, their effects are limited and side-effects like mental confusion, sedation, mood swings, and short-term memory loss occur. Medical cannabis can be used as an adjunct therapy.

==== Ketogenic diet ====
One complex case study found that a ketogenic type diet may have been helpful in reducing symptoms associated with alternating hemiplegia of childhood (AHC) of a young child. However, as the researchers noted, their results could have been corollary in nature and not due to the diet itself, though future research is warranted.

=== Surgery ===
Schematic representation of a patient with cervical dystonia, with deep brain stimulation (DBS) electrodes implanted in the internal globus pallidus (GPi)

Surgery, such as the denervation of selected muscles, may also provide some relief; however, the destruction of nerves in the limbs or brain is not reversible and should be considered only in the most extreme cases. Recently, the procedure of deep brain stimulation (DBS) has proven successful in a number of cases of severe generalised dystonia. DBS as treatment for medication-refractory dystonia, on the other hand, may increase the risk of suicide in patients. However, reference data of patients without DBS therapy are lacking.

=== Non-invasive MRgFUS treatment ===
The first successful non-invasive treatment of medication-refractory focal hand dystonia and of cervical dystonia using MRI-guided focused ultrasound have been reported. The method does not require incision, general anaesthesia, or device implantation. In the United States, the Food and Drug Administration has approved this method only for the treatment of essential tremor and Parkinson's disease. Some other countries have approved this treatment for dystonia.

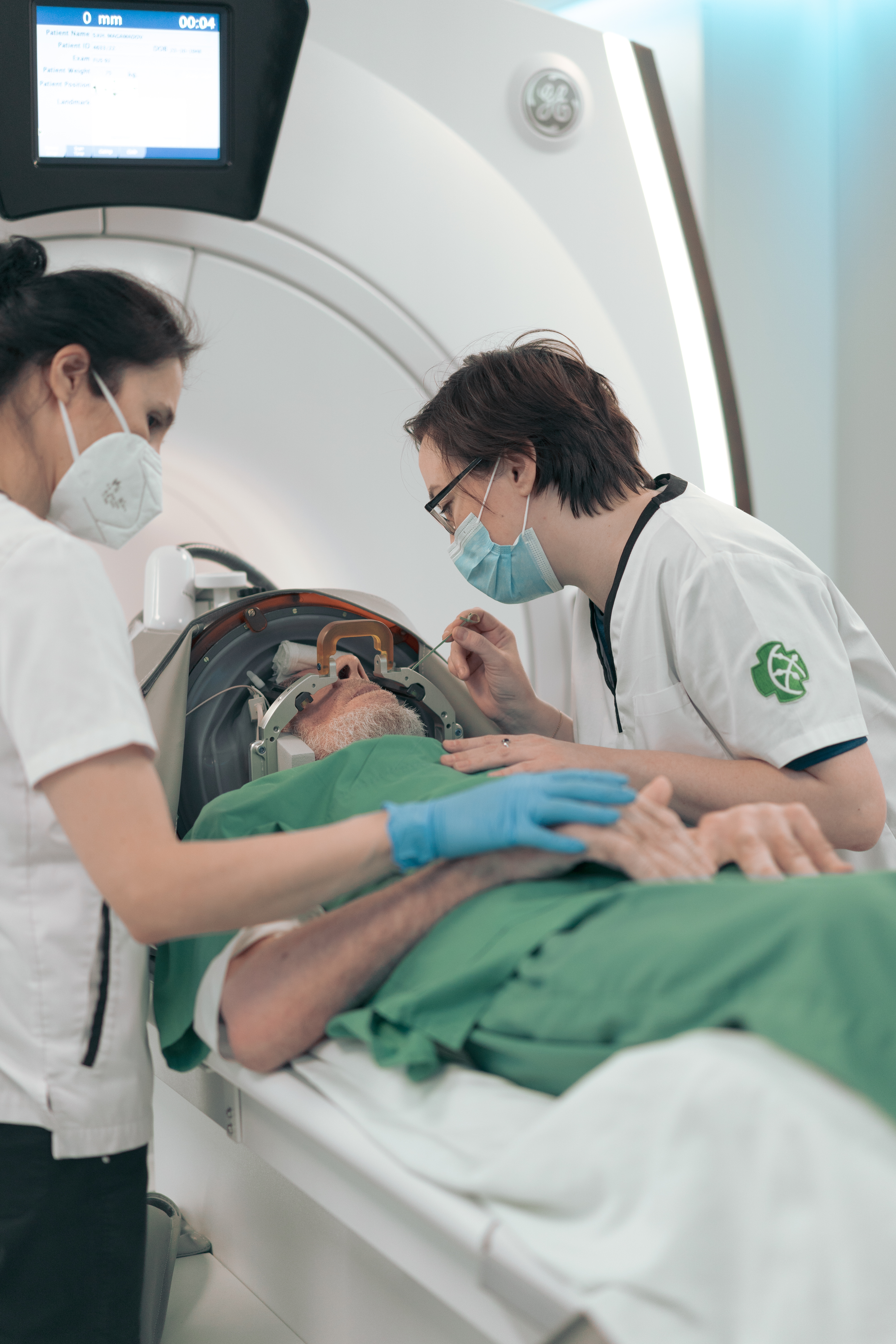
MRgFUS treatment. Doctors perform neurological tests on a conscious patient with dystonia.

== Epidemiology ==
Dystonia is considered the third most common movement disorder after Parkinson's disease and essential tremor. Epidemiological data vary due to differences in study design, diagnostic criteria, and population ascertainment, with service-based studies often underestimating prevalence compared to population-based approaches. Prevalence and incidence vary by study. A 2022 meta-analysis reported a pooled prevalence of idiopathic/inherited isolated dystonia of ~30.9 per 100,000 (95% CI 5.1–187.7), with subtype estimates (per 100,000) of cervical 9.95, blepharospasm 2.82, upper-limb 1.27, oromandibular 0.57, and laryngeal 0.40.

== History ==
The Italian Bernardino Ramazzini provided one of the first descriptions of task-specific dystonia in 1713 in a book of occupational diseases, The Morbis Artificum. In chapter II of this book's Supplementum, Ramazzini noted that "Scribes and Notaries" may develop "incessant movement of the hand, always in the same direction ... the continuous and almost tonic strain on the muscles ... that results in failure of power in the right hand". A report from the British Civil Service also contained an early description of writer's cramp. In 1864, Solly coined the term "scrivener's palsy" for this condition. These historical reports usually attributed the etiology of the motor abnormalities to overuse. Then, dystonia was reported in detail in 1911, when Hermann Oppenheim, Edward Flatau and Wladyslaw Sterling described some Jewish children affected by a syndrome that was retrospectively considered to represent familial cases of DYT1 dystonia. Some decades later, in 1975, the first international conference on dystonia was held in New York. It was then recognized that, in addition to severe generalized forms, the dystonia phenotype also encompasses poorly-progressive focal and segmental cases with onset in adulthood, such as blepharospasm, torticollis and writer's cramp. These forms were previously considered independent disorders and were mainly classified among neuroses. A modern definition of dystonia was worded some years later, in 1984. During the following years it became evident that dystonia syndromes are numerous and diversified, new terminological descriptors (e.g., dystonia plus, heredodegenerative dystonias, etc.) and additional classification schemes were introduced. The clinical complexity of dystonia was then fully recognized.

== See also ==
- Extrapyramidal symptoms
- Hypertonia
- Sydenham's chorea
- Ulegyria (brain condition with dystonia symptoms)
