= Paroxysmal exercise-induced dystonia =

Episodes of involuntary movement triggered by exercise

- Other names: Paroxysmal exertion-induced dyskinesia
- This condition is inherited in an autosomal dominant manner
- Specialty: Neurology

Paroxysmal exercise-induced dystonia (PED) is a rare neurological disorder that belongs to the paroxysmal dyskinesias, a group of rare movement disorders that involve attacks of hyperkinesia with intact consciousness. It is characterized by sudden, transient, involuntary movements, often including repetitive twisting motions and painful posturing triggered by exercise or other physical exertion. The term paroxysmal indicates that the episodes are sudden and short lived and usually unpredicted, and return to normal is rapid. The number of reported cases of people with PED is very small leading to difficulty in studying and classifying this disease and most studies are limited to a very small number of test subjects.

== Symptoms and signs ==
Episodes are relatively short-lived, lasting anywhere from 5–30 minutes, and in most cases disappear completely after cessation of the physical exercise. Most patients will experience 1 to 5 episodes per month, but some can have attacks daily. The muscles most often affected are usually in the legs and feet (75% of reported cases), but the upper body muscles such as the arms, face, neck, and trunk have also been observed to be affected during the episodes of dystonia. Age of onset is usually sometime in childhood, but can range from 1–30 years old. In one study it was found that the mean age of onset was around 8 years. Similarly in the study, the legs were the most common affected part of the body and the attacks were reported as stiffening and cramps by those affected. During an episode of PED patients find walking nearly impossible. Cerebral spinal fluid analysis showed a two-fold increase of homovanillic acid and 5-hydroxyindoleacetic acid immediately following exercise compared to normal levels. This indicated that increased dopaminergic transmission could contribute to PED and other paroxysmal dyskinesias. Neurological examinations, EEG, and brain imaging are all normal in PED patients.

== Causes ==
=== Familial ===
In most cases, PED is familial, but can also be sporadic. In familial cases, pedigrees examined have shown PED to be an autosomal-dominant inheritance trait. PED also has been associated with Parkinson's disease, epilepsy and migraines, although the exact relationship between these is unknown.

A suspected contributor to familial PED is a mutation in the GLUT1 gene, SLC2A1, which codes for the transporter GLUT1, a protein responsible for glucose entry across the blood–brain barrier. It is not thought that the mutation causes a complete loss of function of the protein but rather only slightly reduces the transporter's activity. In a study of PED patients, a median cerebrospinal fluid/blood glucose ratio of .52 compared to a normal .60 was found. In addition, reduced glucose uptake by mutated transporters compared with wild-type in Xenopus oocytes confirmed a pathogenic role of these mutations.

Another recent study was performed to continue to look at the possible connection between PED and mutations on the SLC2A1 gene which codes for the GLUT1 transporter. While PED can occur in isolation it was also noted that it occurs in association with epilepsy as well. In this study the genetics of a five-generation family with history of PED and epilepsy were evaluated. From the results it was noted that most of the mutations were due to frameshift and missense mutations. When looking at homologous GLUT1 transporters in other species it was noted that serine (position 95), valine (position 140), and asparagine (position 317) were highly conserved and therefore mutations in these residues would most likely be pathogenic. Therefore, these are areas of interest when looking at what could lead to PED. All mutations that were observed appeared to only affect the ability of GLUT1 to transport glucose and not the ability for it to be inserted in the membrane. The observed maximum transport velocity of glucose was reduced anywhere from 3 to 10 fold.

A study was performed to determine if the mutation known for the PNKD locus on chromosome 2q33-35 was the cause of PED. In addition, other loci were observed such as the familial hemiplegic migraine (FHM) locus on chromosome 19p, or the familial infantile convulsions and paroxysmal choreoathetosis (ICCA). All three of these suspected regions were found to not contain any mutations, and were therefore ruled out as possible candidates for a cause of PED.

=== Sporadic ===
Sporadic cases may be brought on by minor head injuries and concussions. This was observed in one patient who started experiencing painless dystonia after mild exercise following a concussion. More research still needs to be done to determine how injuries can induce PED, as little is known in this area. Two cases of PED have been associated with insulinomas, after removal of which the symptoms of PED were resolved.

== Diagnosis ==
Since the age of onset is relatively young of PED it is important to correctly diagnose this disease. The limited cases and limited knowledge of the disease makes this difficult but a few characteristics seem to be consistent. It appears that patients with PED would have normal neurological examinations and MRI but the noticeable characteristic would be in low levels of glucose in the cerebral spinal fluid due to the GLUT1 mutations.

=== Related disorders ===
PED differs from two closely related disorders, for example paroxysmal kinesogenic dyskinesia (PKD) and paroxysmal nonkinesigenic dyskinesia (PNKD), based on what brings on the symptoms, namely prolonged exercise, such as brisk walking or running for at least 10 minutes. This is in contrast to PKD where the symptoms are brought about by sudden movements, and PNKD where the symptoms are spontaneous in nature and prolonged. PED is usually affects muscles on both sides of the body (bilateral), it has also been observed to have unilateral effects.

PED has also been shown to be a precursor to Parkinson's disease. In two observed cases, PED preceded any symptoms of Parkinson's Disease by 1.5 and 5 years. Although a rare indicator, PED can be an early sign of the disorder, suggesting they are related. In one case a patient with PED showed evidence of dopamine depletion revealed by a dopamine transporter SPECT scan. This is typical of Parkinson's disease, further showing the linkage between the diseases.

A correlation between epilepsy and PED has been observed in several families across multiple generations, demonstrating an autosomal dominant heritability of symptoms. The occurrence of coexistent seizures and PED symptoms are observed mainly during infancy and childhood, with symptoms of PED continuing throughout a lifetime. Epileptic seizures vary in type and have been observed as absence and generalized seizures. Simultaneous seizure and PED attacks are often premeditated by bouts of dizziness. Attacks have been shown to be reduced or prevented with food ingestion, although the reasons for this are unclear. Various evidence shows that the disorders are likely caused by dysfunction in voltage-gated ion channels, which may lead to abnormal excitability in different brain regions, specifically the cerebral cortex and basal ganglia.

== Treatments ==
As there appeared to be a connection with PED and mutated GLUT1 transporters a possible treatment was looking at changing patients diets. A common treatment for another disorder (GLUT1 Deficiency Syndrome) with a mutated GLUT1 transporter is the ketogenic diet. The diet is a strict 3:1 ratio of fat (3) to protein and carbohydrates (1). This diet is thought to help restore the unbalance created by the decreased amount of glucose in the brain caused by the faulty GLUT1 transporter. This diet was administered to three patients who had been screened and found to have mutation in their SLC2A genes coding for GLUT1 and were experiencing PED symptoms. All three showed benefit from this treatment and a reduction in their PED episodes. They were able to exercise and run long distances for the first time in their lives. No other studies have been performed using this diet as many patients feel the advantages of the diet do not outweigh its disadvantages.

As some cases have noted that patients were able to alleviate or lessen their PED attacks with a sugary snack, another diet that was tried on patients was one rich in carbohydrates with additional frequent carbohydrate-containing snacks. Four patients with reported PED symptoms were put on this diet but no observable improvements were noted and in fact one patient even complained of worsening symptoms.

Additionally it has been observed that levodopa may reduce some symptoms associated with PED. This may demonstrate that PED is a precursor to Parkinson's disease. Acetazolamide was beneficial to some patients, but also worsened symptoms in others. Additionally, a modified version of the Atkin's diet helped to regulate glucose levels in the cerebrospinal fluid. Patients with PED associated with insulinomas appeared to have symptoms resolved after consuming sugary drinks. Currently, there are no drugs that are particularly useful in completely curing all symptoms.

== Epidemiology ==
There are very few reported cases of PED, there are approximately 20 reported sporadic cases of PED and 9 PED families but there is some dispute on the exact number of cases. In addition it appears that PED becomes less severe with aging. Prior to onset of a PED episode some patients reported onset of symptoms including sweating, pallor, and hyperventilation. In brain scans it was observed that patients suffering form frequent PEDs there was increased metabolism in the putamen of the brain and decreased metabolism in the frontal lobe. Another study using subtraction single photon emission computed tomographic (SPECT) imaging technique which was coregistered with an MRI on a patient presented with PED symptoms showed increased cerebral perfusion in the primary somatosensory cortex area, and a mild increase in the region of the primary motor cortex and cerebellum. While all these correlations are not fully understand as to what exactly is happening in the brain it provides areas of interest to study further to hopefully understand PED more fully.

== Research ==
Since paroxysmal exercise-induced dystonia is such a rare disorder it makes it difficult to study the disease and find consistencies. Many of the current studies seem to have contradicting conclusion but this is due to the fact that studies are usually limited to a very small number of test subjects. With such small numbers it is hard to determine what is a trend and what is random when in comes to characterizing the disease. Further study is needed to find better diagnostic techniques and treatments for PED. Patients with PED are living a limited lifestyle since simple tasks like walking and exercise are often impossible.

== See also ==
- Paroxysmal dyskinesia
- Paroxysmal nonkinesogenic dyskinesia
