= Paroxysmal dyskinesia =

Movement disorders with episodes of excessive restlessness

- Other names: Paroxysmal dystonic choreoathetosis
- Specialty: Neurology

The paroxysmal dyskinesias (PD) are a group of movement disorders characterized by attacks (paroxysms) of hyperkinesia (excessive restlessness) with intact consciousness. Paroxysmal dyskinesia is a rare disorder, however the number of individuals it affects remains unclear. There are three different subtypes of PD that include paroxysmal kinesigenic dyskinesia (PKD), paroxysmal nonkinesigenic dyskinesia (PNKD), and paroxysmal exercise-induced dystonia (PED). Other neurological diseases have similar symptoms to PD, such as epilepsy and Parkinson's. The different subtypes make accurate and quick diagnosis of PD challenging. Thus, PD is often under reported and misdiagnosed, making it difficult to accurately study its prevalence in human populations. Onset of PD is usually in late childhood to early adolescence. New drug regimens help treat symptoms of PD, but no cure for the disorder is known.

== Types ==
These movement disorders are classified into three main types based on their triggers and the duration and frequency of the attacks.

=== Paroxysmal kinesigenic dyskinesia (PKD) ===
This is characterized by attacks of involuntary movements (dystonia, chorea, or ballism), which are typically triggered by sudden voluntary movements, but can also be triggered by involuntary movements as well (for example, hyperventilating). These voluntary movements usually involve whole body activity such as standing, walking, and running. The age of onset is typically in childhood or early adolescence with most cases reporting improvement or complete remission with aging. Attacks last from seconds to minutes and are known to be at higher risk of occurring during stress, fear, cold, heat, or menstruation.

=== Paroxysmal non-kinesogenic dyskinesia (PNKD) ===
This is similar to PKD, characterizing as an episodic movement disorder, but is not triggered by voluntary movements. The attacks for PNKD are spontaneous and last from hours to days. It is an autosomal dominant disorder passing to nearly 50% of the offspring. Some predisposing factors include stress, excitement, alcoholic beverages, tea, and beverages with caffeine.

=== Paroxysmal exercise-induced dyskinesia (PED) ===
This is an extremely rare type of paroxysmal dyskinesia characterized by sudden, involuntary, dystonic movements, often including repetitive twisting motions and painful posturing. The attacks are triggered by exercise and other physical exertion, and usually last from minutes to an hour. Attacks usually appear in the body part that is being exercised or exerted over a period of time, perhaps 10 to 15 minutes.

== Signs and symptoms ==
=== PKD ===
The symptoms for PKD are varied from case to case, however, typically they consist of involuntary movements. Such contractile movements include dystonia, chorea, athetosis, and ballism. For example, “Her attacks were characterized as sudden unilateral stiffness of upper and lower limbs followed by an involuntary extrarotation of the arm and leg.” Another frequently occurring symptom is the presence of an aura before the attack. These sensations manifest in several forms, usually described as a tingling in the target limb.

A single limb is the most frequently affected area; however it is possible for an attack to affect more than one limb. When more than one limb is affected, the two limbs are usually unilateral (same side), even though cases of bilateral (opposite sides) symptoms have also been observed. Another frequently affected area is the torso, with some PKD patients twisting their body.

Attacks experienced by PKD patients typically last less than a minute; however, longer attacks can also occur. To further distinguish between PKD and epilepsy, patients typically retain consciousness during their attacks, and are able to recall the attacks even after they have ended. Despite retaining consciousness, patients are usually incapable of speech during the attack and may experience great pain in the affected area. The frequency of attacks vary greatly. Some patients have been noted as having hundreds of attacks per day, while others go months without an attack.

=== PNKD ===
The attacks consist of dystonia, chorea, and athetosis just like PKD. They are mostly of the limbs, and are usually unilateral or asymmetric. What sets PNKD apart from PKD is that the attacks can last anywhere from four minutes to four hours, but shorter and longer attacks have been reported as well.

The attacks also affect the limbs, usually unilaterally, but bilateral symptoms have also been experienced. PNKD patients usually report the presence of an aura before an attack as well; however they are usually different from those of PKD patients. Once again the aura varies, but is typically felt in the target limb. Another frequently noted aura is dizziness

PNKD patients experience attacks that last much longer than those of PKD. These attacks vary in length and can last anywhere between four minutes and four hours. Similar to the difference between length of attacks, the intervals between attacks are much longer. The Interval between PNKD patients’ attacks is from one day to several months.

=== PED ===
PED attacks are characterized in multiple ways. One distinguishing characteristic of PED patients is that they typically experience longer durations of dystonia during their attacks. The most frequent target of attacks are both legs bilaterally, rather than unilateral symptoms. The attacks have also been known to affect the upper half of the body as well. In some cases, patients have had attacks that affected the posturing of their neck and shoulder. Usually there is not an indicative aura symptom prior to a PED attack, which has to do with the nature of the onset of attacks.

The duration and frequency of PED attacks fall between those of PKD and PNKD. The attacks can be relieved with rest, typically taking about 10 minutes from cessation of the exercise. Attacks usually do not last longer than 30 minutes. Attacks typically occur at intervals of between a day and a month, however, there is a great deal of variability here. This variability can be contributed to the nature of the onset of attacks.

== Causes ==
All PD associated subtypes have genetic contributions and are likely to run in a families genetic history due to dominant allele mutations. Mutations of identified genes have been leading areas of research in the study and treatment of paroxysmal dyskinesia. PKD, PNKD, and PED are classified as separate subtypes because they all have different presentations of symptoms, but also, because they are believed to have different pathologies.

Studies on diseases that are similar in nature to PD have revealed insights into the causes of movement disorders. Hypnogenic paroxysmal dyskinesia is a form of epilepsy affecting the frontal lobe. Single genes have been identified on chromosomes 15, 20, and 21, which contribute to the pathology of these epilepsy disorders. Utilizing new knowledge about pathologies of related and similar disease can shed insight on the causal relationships in paroxysmal dyskinesia.

=== PKD ===
Numerous causes have been proposed for PKD, such as genetic mutations, multiple sclerosis, brain trauma, and endocrine dysfunction. This is not an exhaustive list; many other causes are being proposed and studied. Until causal genes can be identified, the pathology of PKD will not be fully understood. Researchers have identified specific loci in chromosomes 16 and 22, which have been reported to have a genotype–phenotype correlation.

=== PNKD ===
Research on the pathology for PNKD suggests that mutations to specific nucleotide sequences in chromosome 2, MR-1 (myofibrililogenesis regulator - 1) may be linked to PNKD. Studies on MR-1 reveal that it serves as a detoxifying agent. PNKD is sometimes induced by the consumption of alcohol or coffee. Individuals with a mutation in the MR-1 gene sequence may have problems detoxifying the body when alcohol or caffeine is ingested, perhaps resulting in the onset of PNKD.

Other studies have revealed a possible mutation on the calcium sensitive potassium (BK) channel. A mutation affecting the influx and efflux of potassium and calcium can cause large scale changes in a neuron. This specific mutation leads to increased excitability of the neuron, often inducing rapid depolarization eliciting numerous action potentials.

The pathogenesis of PKND is partially defined by the identification of mutations in the myofibrillogenesis regulator 1 (MR-1), whose gene product is an enzyme involved in the detoxification of methylglyoxal (a compound present in coffee, cola, and alcoholic beverages).

=== PED ===
Long periods of continuous physical exercise is often considered the causal factor involved in a PED diagnosis. PED a is sometimes co-diagnosed with epilepsy and young-onset Parkinson's disease. Correlations between the causes of young-onset Parkinson's disease and PED may be due to a similar problem, specifically a mutation of a potassium channel gene on chromosome 1.

The pathogenesis of PED has also been linked to mutations in the GLUT1 glucose transporter which can result in transient energy deficits in the basal ganglia. See GLUT1 deficiency syndrome.

== Diagnosis ==
Diagnosis is similar, but slightly different for each type of PD. Some types are more understood than others, and therefore have more criteria for diagnosis.

=== PKD ===
The guidelines for diagnosing PKD were reviewed and confirmed by Unterberger and Trinka. PKD consists of unexpected forms of involuntary movements of the body. The patient is usually diagnosed sometime before their 20s, and is more likely diagnosed during childhood than early adulthood. Almost all PKD's are idiopathic, but there have been examples of autosomal dominant inheritance as well. Physical examination and brain imaging examinations show normal results, and an EEG shows no specific abnormalities as well. However, the negative synchronous EEG results can be used to prove that PKD is not a sort of reflex epilepsy, but a different disease.

PKD is the most prevalent subtype of paroxysmal dyskinesia, encompassing over 80% of all given PD diagnosis. PKD is more prevalent in boys, usually as high as 3.75:1.

=== PNKD ===
PNKD has a set guideline for diagnosis that is slightly different from PKD. PNKD usually occurs unexpectedly, and is not brought on by sudden movements or exercise. Instead the attacks are brought on by stresses such as emotional stress, fatigue, alcohol, or caffeine consumption. Just like PKD, PNKD also shows autosomal dominance in family history. Physical examination and brain imaging examinations show normal results, and EEG shows no specific abnormalities as well.

PNKD is more prevalent in boys, with ratios of 1.4:1.

=== PED ===
PED has a set guideline for diagnosis that is similar, but slightly different from both PKD and PNKD. PED attacks consist of dystonic and bilateral movements usually in the lower limbs of the body. These attacks are usually brought about only by exercise and physical exhaustion. PED patients do not feel an aura-like sensation before an attack occurs, unlike PKD and PNKD. These attacks usually last from 5 to 30 minutes, and can occur once a day or once a month. Physical examination and brain imaging examinations show normal results, and EEG shows no specific abnormalities as well.

PED is the rarest paraoxysmal dyskinesia subtype.

== Management ==
=== PKD ===
PKD patients usually show a good response to anticonvulsants. Most commonly used medications are sodium blockers, carbamazepine and phenytoin. During a drug-testing study, patients reported a decreasing response to the latter use of anticonvulsants and switched to carbamazepine or phenytoin. Refraining from established triggers such as sudden movement has been shown to lessen attacks occurrences. Avoidance of predisposing factors such as stress, excitement, and fatigue also help manage attacks.

=== PNKD ===
Treatment for PKND is more difficult than other Paroxysmal Dyskinesias. The majority of patients experience some relief from low dosages of clonazepam, a muscle relaxant and anticonvulsant. Similar to PKD, avoidance of stress, excitement, and fatigue will lower the frequency of PNKD attacks. Many patients also avoid known methyglyoxal containing foods and beverages such as alcohol, coffee, tea, and chocolate.

=== PED ===
PED patients usually avoid prolonged, continuous exertion to prevent occurrence of attacks. Use of anticonvulsants such as benzodiazepines show little to no success in PED patients. A few cases have shown that patients were able to lessen their attacks with a high carbohydrate snack. A new approach to managing PED is the ketogenic diet, which alters the primary cerebral energy metabolism from glucose to ketone bodies. Reports have shown that the ketonic diet protects against seizures in epilepsy. In PED, it is probable that ketones will provide sufficient energy for the basal ganglia, which is normally deficient in patients with PED.

== Prognosis ==
Paroxysmal dyskinesia is not a fatal disease. Life can be extremely difficult with this disease depending on the severity. The prognosis of PD is extremely difficult to determine because the disease varies from person to person. The attacks for PKD can be reduced and managed with proper anticonvulsants, but there is no particular end in sight for any of the PD diseases. PKD has been described to cease for some patients after the age of 20, and two patients have reported to have a family history of the disease where PKD went into complete remission after the age of 23. With PNKD and PED, at this time, there is no proper way to determine an accurate prognosis.
