= Infantile convulsions and choreoathetosis =

- Other names: Paroxysmal kinesigenic dyskinesia and infantile convulsions
- Infantile convulsions and choreoathetosis is inherited via an autosomal dominant manner

Infantile convulsions and choreoathetosis (ICCA) syndrome is a neurological genetic disorder with an autosomal dominant mode of inheritance. It is characterized by the association of benign familial infantile epilepsy (BIFE) at age 3–12 months and later in life with paroxysmal kinesigenic choreoathetosis. The ICCA syndrome was first reported in 1997 in four French families from north-western France and provided the first genetic evidence for common mechanisms shared by benign infantile seizures and paroxysmal dyskinesia. The epileptic origin of PKC has long been a matter of debates and PD have been classified as reflex epilepsies. Indeed, attacks of PKC and epileptic seizures have several characteristics in common, they both are paroxysmal in presentation with a tendency to spontaneous remission, and a subset of PKC responds well to anticonvulsants. This genetic disease has been mapped to chromosome 16p-q12. More than 30 families with the clinical characteristics of ICCA syndrome have been described worldwide so far.

== Presentation ==
The specific and familial association of BIFE and PKC defines a novel clinical entity : the infantile convulsions and choreoathetosis syndrome. The first observation was made in four families where children were affected with nonfebrile convulsions at age 3–12 months. Partial epileptic seizures started with a psychomotor arrest and a deviation of the head and eyes to one side, followed inconstantly by unilateral jerks. In some cases, seizures generalized secondarily. None of the interictal electroencephalograms showed epileptiform abnormalities, and magnetic-resonance imaging were normal. These convulsions had a favorable outcome. At 5–8 years of age affected children developed abnormal movements. They presented with twisting movements of the hands of a reptilian type when stressed or embarrassed. They also developed jerky movements of the legs after running. Initially, abnormal movements were intermediate in speed between quick and slow, typical of paroxysmal choreoathetosis. Combinations of abnormal movements involving the arms, legs, trunk and occasionally the head were observed. The attacks lasted only a few minutes, occurring with a frequency of 5-30 episodes per day and were not accompanied by unconsciousness. In all patients, abnormal movements disappeared at 25–30 years of age without any treatment. Since the first report similar clinical presentations have been published which confirm the specificity of the ICCA syndrome.

== Genetics ==
In affected individuals presenting with the ICCA syndrome, the human genome was screened with microsatellite markers regularly spaced, and strong evidence of linkage with the disease was obtained in the pericentromeric region of chromosome 16, with a maximum lod score, for D16S3133 of 6.76 at a recombination fraction of 0. The disease gene has been mapped at chromosome 16p12-q12. This linkage has been confirmed by different authors. The chromosome 16 ICCA locus shows complicated genomic architecture and the ICCA gene remains unknown.
