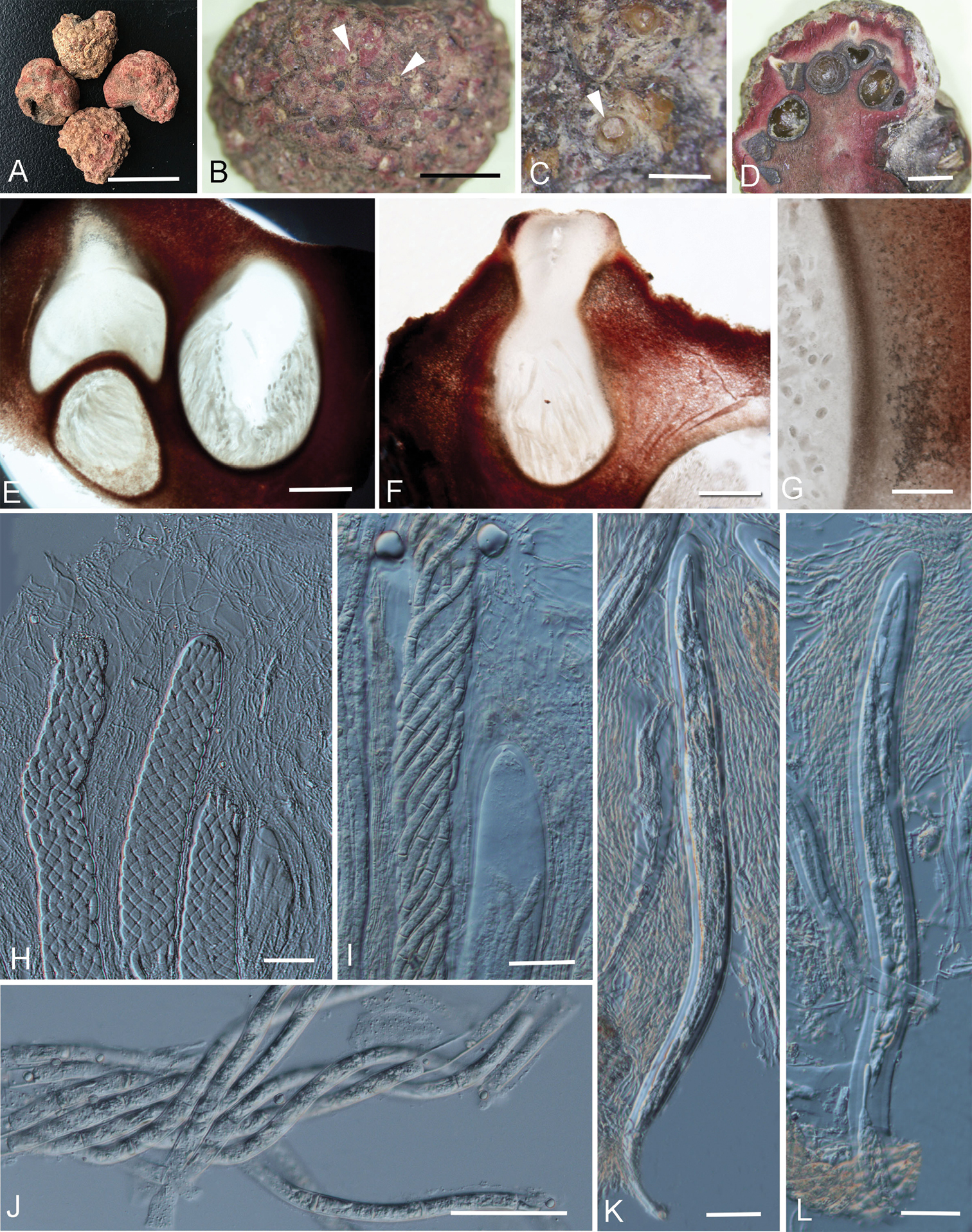
- Rubroshiraia bambusae

Scientific classification
- Kingdom: Fungi
- Division: Ascomycota
- Class: Dothideomycetes
- Order: Pleosporales
- Family: Shiraiaceae
- Genus: Rubroshiraia; D.Q. Dai & K.D. Hyde
- Species: R. bambusae

Binomial name
- Rubroshiraia bambusae D.Q. Dai & K.D. Hyde

= Rubroshiraia =

Genus of fungi

Rubroshiraia is a monotypic genus of the family Shiraiaceae. Its only species, Rubroshiraia bambusae, is a bamboo-dwelling fungus native to China. It and its genus Rubroshiraia were first formally named in 2019. It grows in western China, native to Yunnan on bamboos on which it forms a fruit-like pink ball. It was known as zhuhongjun and was traditionally used to treat arthritis as well as infantile convulsions.
