= PNKD =

Protein-coding gene in the species Homo sapiens

Identifiers
- Aliases: PNKD, BRP17, DYT8, FPD1, KIPP1184, MR-1, MR1, PDC, PKND1, TAHCCP2, FKSG19, paroxysmal nonkinesigenic dyskinesia, PNKD1, MBL domain containing, MR-1S, PNKD metallo-beta-lactamase domain containing, R1
- External IDs: OMIM: 609023; MGI: 1930773; HomoloGene: 75045; GeneCards: PNKD; OMA:PNKD - orthologs

Gene location (Human)
Chr.	Chromosome 2 (human)
Band	2q35	Start	218,269,651 bp
Band	2q35	End	218,346,793 bp

Gene location (Mouse)
Chr.	Chromosome 1 (mouse)
Band	1|1 C3	Start	74,324,089 bp
Band	1|1 C3	End	74,392,853 bp
RNA expression pattern
Bgee	Human / Mouse (ortholog); Top expressed in: right uterine tube; right lobe of liver; mucosa of transverse colon; right lobe of thyroid gland; left lobe of thyroid gland; Brodmann area 9; right frontal lobe; prefrontal cortex; cingulate gyrus; anterior cingulate cortex / Top expressed in: pontine nuclei; superior colliculus; yolk sac; CA3 field; right kidney; perirhinal cortex; medulla oblongata; central gray substance of midbrain; primary visual cortex; entorhinal cortex; More reference expression data
BioGPS	n/a
Gene ontology
Molecular function	hydroxyacylglutathione hydrolase activity; protein binding; hydrolase activity; metal ion binding
Cellular component	cytoplasm; membrane; mitochondrion; nucleus
Biological process	regulation of synaptic transmission, dopaminergic; methylglyoxal catabolic process to D-lactate via S-lactoyl-glutathione; negative regulation of neurotransmitter secretion; neuromuscular process controlling posture; regulation of dopamine metabolic process
Sources:Amigo / QuickGO
Orthologs
Species	Human	Mouse
Entrez	25953	56695
Ensembl	ENSG00000127838	ENSMUSG00000026179
UniProt	Q8N490	Q69ZP3
RefSeq (mRNA)	NM_022572; NM_001077399; NM_015488	NM_001039509; NM_019999; NM_025580
RefSeq (protein)	NP_001070867; NP_056303; NP_072094	NP_001034598; NP_064383; NP_079856
Location (UCSC)	Chr 2: 218.27 – 218.35 Mb	Chr 1: 74.32 – 74.39 Mb
PubMed search
- Wikidata
View/Edit Human	View/Edit Mouse

PNKD is the abbreviation for a human neurological movement disorder paroxysmal nonkinesiogenic dyskinesia. Like many other human genetics disorders, PNKD also refers to the disease, the disease gene and the encoded protein. (PNKD) is a protein that in humans is encoded by the PNKD gene. Alternative splicing results in the transcription of three isoforms. The mouse ortholog is called brain protein 17 (Brp17).

== Structure ==
This gene is located on chromosome 2 at the band 2q35 and contains 12 exons. At least three isoforms of varying lengths (long, medium, and short) can be produced by alternative splicing of this gene. While the gene products of the long (PNKD-L) and medium (PNKD-M) isoforms contain the C-terminal β-lactamase domain, the short (PNKD-S) isoform, commonly referred to as myofibrillogenesis regulator-1 (MR-1), contains only three exons and lacks homology to any known protein. These isoforms also differ in their tissue-specific expression and subcellular localization. Specifically, PNKD-L is only expressed in the central nervous system whereas PNKD-M and PNKD-S are ubiquitously expressed across tissues. Moreover, PNKD-L localizes to the cell membrane, PNKD-S to the cytoplasm and nucleus, and PNKD-M to the mitochondrion.

== Function ==
The function of PNKD proteins are unknown but the long and medium isoforms of PNKD contain a conserved β-lactamase domain which suggest it may function as an enzyme. The closest mammalian homolog to PNKD is HAGH, an enzyme involves in a two-step reaction to hydrolyze SLG and produce D-lactic acid and reduced GSH. However, the hydrolytic activity of PNKD is minimal.

The long form of PNKD is neuronal specific and encodes a synaptic protein that localizes dominantly to the pre-synaptic membrane. Post-synaptic area and vesicular structure also occasionally has PNKD long form. PNKD long form interacts with pre-synaptic protein RIM and inhibits synaptic exocytosis. PNKD with disease mutations is less effective in inhibition thus the synaptic release is increased. This would cause excessive neurotransmitter release in the brain and maybe the root cause for triggering epilepsy in PNKD patients.

== Clinical significance ==
Point mutations in PNKD exon 1 cause an inherited neurological movement disorder in humans called paroxysmal nonkinesigenic dyskinesia. Overexpression of PNKD has also been associated with multiple cancers, including pancreatic ductal adenocarcinoma, gastric cancer, ovarian cancer, and breast cancer and may serve as a therapeutic target for treating these cancers or a biomarker for assessing patient outcomes. The signaling pathways involved may vary depending on the cancer. For instance, in human breast cancer (MCF7) cells, PNKD may promote tumor cell proliferation by activating the MEK/ERK signaling pathway, while in human hepatoma (HepG2) cells, PNKD may operate through the MLC2/FAK/AKT pathway.

== Interactions ==
PNKD has been shown to interact with:

- Rab3-interacting molecule (RIM)1
- RIM2
