= Benign familial infantile epilepsy =

- Other names: Benign familial infantile seizures (BFIS), benign familial infantile convulsions (BFIC)
- Specialty: Neurology

Benign familial infantile epilepsy (BFIE) is an epilepsy syndrome. Affected children, who have no other health or developmental problems, develop seizures during infancy. These seizures have focal origin within the brain but may then spread to become generalised seizures. The seizures may occur several times a day, often grouped in clusters over one to three days followed by a gap of one to three months. Treatment with anticonvulsant drugs is not necessary but they are often prescribed and are effective at controlling the seizures. This form of epilepsy resolves after one or two years, and appears to be completely benign. The EEG of these children, between seizures, is normal. The brain appears normal on MRI scan.

A family history of epilepsy in infancy distinguishes this syndrome from the non-familial classification (see benign infantile epilepsy), though the latter may be simply sporadic cases of the same genetic mutations. The condition is inherited with an autosomal dominant transmission. There are several genes responsible for this syndrome, on chromosomes 2, 16 and 19. It is generally described as idiopathic, meaning that no other neurological condition is associated with it or causes it. However, there are some forms that are linked to neurological conditions. One variant known as infantile convulsions and choreoathetosis (ICCA) forms an association between BFIE and paroxysmal kinesigenic choreoathetosis and has been linked to the PRRT2 gene on chromosome 16. An association with some forms of familial hemiplegic migraine (FHM) has also been found. Benign familial infantile epilepsy is not genetically related to benign familial neonatal epilepsy (BFNE), which occurs in neonates. However, a variation with seizure onset between two days and seven months called benign familial neonatal–infantile seizures (BFNIS) has been described, which is due to a mutation in the SCN2A gene.

== Treatment ==
Pharmacologic Treatments:

There are several medications available for use and include levetiracetam, topiramate, lamotrigine, phenytoin, vigabatrin, rufinamide, and stiripentol.

Dietary Treatments:

Some studies suggest evidence supporting diet change such as a ketogenic diet or the Modified Atkins diet.
