= Convulsion =

Medical condition where body muscles contract and relax rapidly and repeatedly

- Specialty: Neurology, psychiatry
- Symptoms: Muscle spasms, uncontrollable shaking
- Risk factors: Epilepsy

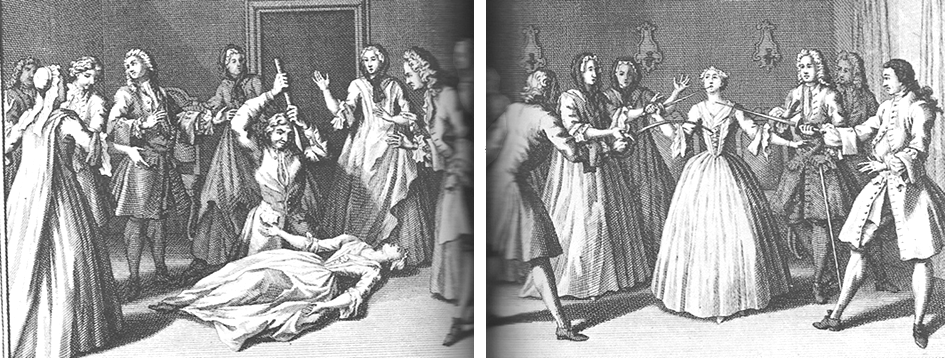
Representation of someone being “rescued” from convulsions

A convulsion is a medical condition where the body muscles contract and relax rapidly and repeatedly, resulting in uncontrolled shaking. Because epileptic seizures typically include convulsions, the term convulsion is often used as a synonym for seizure. However, not all epileptic seizures result in convulsions, and not all convulsions are caused by epileptic seizures. Non-epileptic convulsions have no relation with epilepsy, and are caused by non-epileptic seizures.

Convulsions can be caused by epilepsy, infections (including a severe form of listeriosis which is caused by eating food contaminated by Listeria monocytogenes), brain trauma, or other medical conditions. They can also occur from an electric shock or improperly enriched air for scuba diving.

== Signs and symptoms ==
A person having a convulsion may experience several different symptoms, such as a brief blackout, confusion, drooling, loss of bowel or bladder control, sudden shaking of the entire body, uncontrollable muscle spasms, or temporary cessation of breathing. Symptoms usually last from a few seconds to several minutes, although they can last longer.

Convulsions in children are not necessarily benign, and may lead to brain damage if prolonged. In these patients, the frequency of occurrence should not downplay their significance, as a worsening seizure state may reflect the damage caused by successive attacks. Symptoms may include:

- Lack of awareness
- Loss of consciousness
- Eyes rolling back
- Changes to breathing
- Stiffening of the arms, legs, or whole body
- Jerky movements of the arms, legs, body, or head
- Lack of control over movements
- Inability to respond

== Causes ==
Most convulsions are the result of abnormal electrical activity in the brain. (Note: However, some seizures are not due to electrical disturbances in the brain, such as psychogenic non-epileptic seizures.) Often, a specific cause is not clear. Numerous conditions can cause a convulsion.

Convulsions can be caused by specific chemicals in the blood, as well as infections like meningitis or encephalitis. Other possibilities include celiac disease, head trauma, stroke, or lack of oxygen to the brain. Sometimes the convulsion can be caused by genetic defects or brain tumors. Convulsions can also occur when the blood sugar is too low or there is a deficiency of vitamin B6 (pyridoxine). The pathophysiology of convulsion remains ambiguous.

Convulsions are often caused by epileptic seizures, febrile seizures, non-epileptic seizures, or paroxysmal kinesigenic dyskinesia. In rare cases, it may be triggered by reactions to certain medications, such as antidepressants, stimulants, and antihistamines.

=== Epileptic seizures ===
Epilepsy is a neuronal disorder with multifactorial manifestations. It is a noncontagious illness and is usually associated with sudden attacks of seizures, which are an immediate and initial anomaly in the electrical activity of the brain that disrupts part or all of the body. Various areas of the brain can be disturbed by epileptic events. Epileptic seizures can have contrary clinical features. Epileptic seizures can have long-lasting effects on cerebral blood flow.

Various kinds of epileptic seizures affect 60 million people worldwide.

=== Generalized tonic–clonic seizures ===
A generalized tonic-clonic seizure (GTCS), also known as a grand mal seizure, is a whole-body seizure that has a tonic phase followed by clonic muscle retrenchments. GTCSs can happen in people of all ages. GTCSs are very hazardous, and they increase the risk of injuries and sudden unexpected death in epilepsy (SUDEP). SUDEP is a sudden, unexpected, nontraumatic death in patients with epilepsy. Strong convulsions that are related to GTCSs can also cause falls and severe injuries.

Not all generalized seizures produce convulsions. For example, in an absence seizure, also known as a petit mal seizure, the brain experiences electrical disturbances but the body remains motionless and unresponsive.

=== Febrile convulsion ===
A common cause of convulsions in children is febrile seizures, a type of seizure associated with a high body temperature. This high temperature is a usual immune response to infection, and in febrile convulsions, the reason for the fever is extra-cranial (such as a body-wide viral infection). In Nigeria, malaria—which can cause sudden, high fevers—is a significant cause of convulsions among children under 5 years of age.

Febrile seizures fall into two categories: simple and complex. A simple febrile seizure is generalized, occurs singularly, and lasts less than 15 minutes. A complex febrile seizure can be focused in an area of the body, occur more than once, and lasts for more than 15 minutes. Febrile seizures affect 2–4% of children in the United States and Western Europe. It is the most common childhood seizure. The exact reason for febrile convulsion is unidentified, though it might be the outcome of the interchange between environmental and genetic factors.

=== Psychogenic non-epileptic seizures ===
Psychogenic non-epileptic seizures (PNES) are described as neurobehavioral conditions or "psychogenic illnesses" which occur not due to the electrical disturbances in a person's brain but due to mental and emotional stress. PNES are an important differential diagnosis and a common occurrence in epilepsy centers. According to the 5th Edison of Diagnostic and Statistical Manual of Mental Disorders (DSM 5), PNES is classified as a "conversion disorder" or Functional Neurologic Symptom Disorder characterized by alterations in behavior, motor activity, consciousness, and sensation. A few neuroimaging (functional and structural) studies suggest that PNES may replicate sensorimotor alterations, emotional regulation, cognitive control, and integration of neural circuits.

=== Paroxysmal kinesigenic dyskinesia ===
There is a linkage between infantile convulsion and paroxysmal dyskinesia. Paroxysmal kinesigenic dyskinesia (PKD) is characterized by sudden involuntary movement caused by sudden stress or excitement. The relationship between convulsion and PKD is mainly due to the common mechanism of pathophysiology.
