= CHRNA4 =

Protein-coding gene in humans

Identifiers
- Aliases: CHRNA4, BFNC, EBN, EBN1, NACHR, NACHRA4, NACRA4, cholinergic receptor nicotinic alpha 4 subunit
- External IDs: OMIM: 118504; MGI: 87888; GeneCards: CHRNA4
Available structures
PDB	Ortholog search: PDBe RCSB
PDB	List of PDB id codes 2LLY

Gene location (Human)
Chr.	Chromosome 20 (human)
Band	20q13.33	Start	63,343,223 bp
Band	20q13.33	End	63,378,401 bp

Gene location (Mouse)
Chr.	Chromosome 2 (mouse)
Band	2 H4|2 103.54 cM	Start	180,660,173 bp
Band	2 H4|2 103.54 cM	End	180,685,339 bp
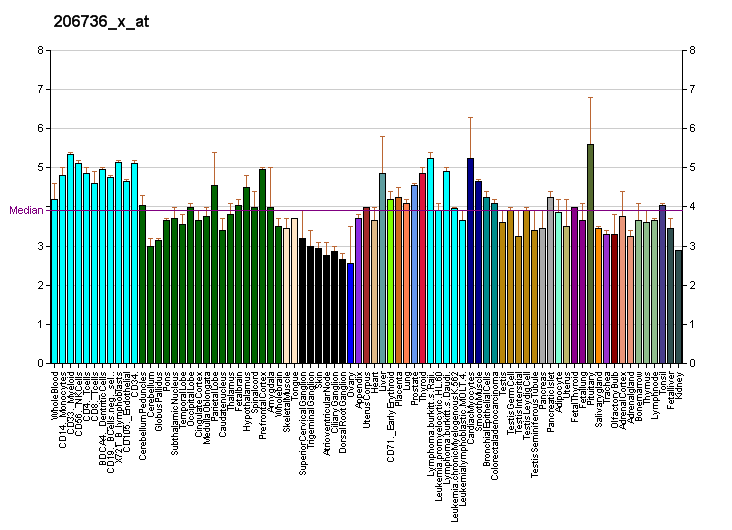

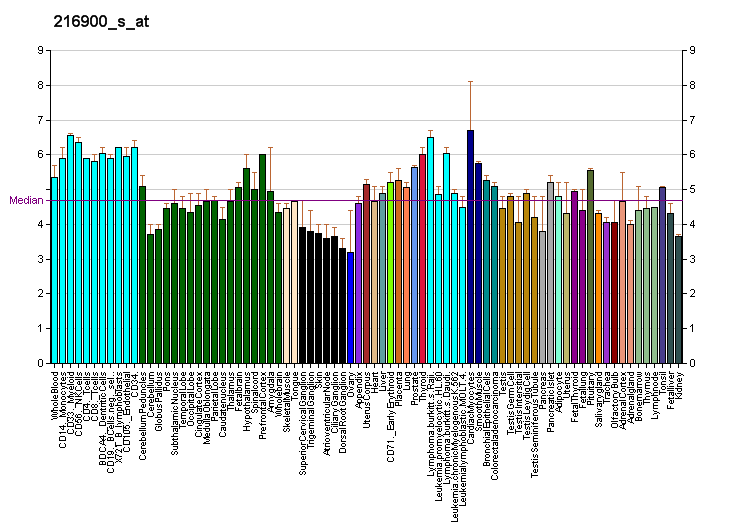

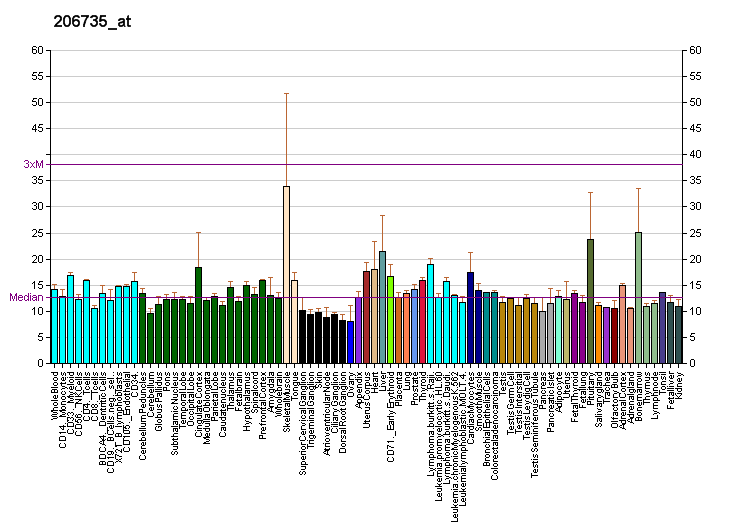
RNA expression pattern
Bgee	Human / Mouse (ortholog); Top expressed in: right lobe of liver; cingulate gyrus; anterior cingulate cortex; right frontal lobe; prefrontal cortex; amygdala; Brodmann area 9; gonad; C1 segment; hypothalamus / Top expressed in: lumbar subsegment of spinal cord; right kidney; substantia nigra; visual cortex; primary visual cortex; neural tube; superior frontal gyrus; dentate gyrus of hippocampal formation granule cell; neural layer of retina; medial dorsal nucleus; More reference expression data
BioGPS	More reference expression data
Gene ontology
Molecular function	acetylcholine binding; acetylcholine receptor activity; ion channel activity; ligand-gated ion channel activity; extracellular ligand-gated ion channel activity; protein binding; acetylcholine-gated cation-selective channel activity; transmembrane signaling receptor activity
Cellular component	integral component of membrane; acetylcholine-gated channel complex; postsynaptic membrane; membrane; plasma membrane; synapse; cell junction; soma; dendrite; external side of plasma membrane; dopaminergic synapse; integral component of presynaptic membrane; integral component of plasma membrane; neuron projection
Biological process	regulation of dopamine secretion; inhibitory postsynaptic potential; response to hypoxia; cognition; locomotory behavior; regulation of membrane potential; response to nicotine; membrane depolarization; nervous system process; synaptic transmission, cholinergic; ion transport; response to oxidative stress; respiratory gaseous exchange by respiratory system; behavioral response to nicotine; B cell activation; neuromuscular synaptic transmission; exploration behavior; action potential; sensory perception of pain; DNA repair; calcium ion transport; signal transduction; chemical synaptic transmission; excitatory postsynaptic potential; acetylcholine receptor signaling pathway; ion transmembrane transport; regulation of synaptic vesicle exocytosis
Sources:Amigo / QuickGO
Orthologs
Databases	NCBI: entry; OMA: entry
Species	Human	Mouse
Entrez	1137	11438
Ensembl	ENSG00000101204	ENSMUSG00000027577
UniProt	P43681	O70174
RefSeq (mRNA)	NM_000744; NM_001256573	NM_015730
RefSeq (protein)	NP_000735; NP_001243502	NP_056545
Location (UCSC)	Chr 20: 63.34 – 63.38 Mb	Chr 2: 180.66 – 180.69 Mb
PubMed search
- Wikidata
View/Edit Human	View/Edit Mouse

Neuronal acetylcholine receptor subunit alpha-4, also known as nAChRα4, is a protein that in humans is encoded by the CHRNA4 gene. The protein encoded by this gene is a subunit of certain nicotinic acetylcholine receptors (nAChR). Alpha4-containing nAChRs (specifically the alpha4beta2 subtype) appear to play a crucial role in the addictive response to nicotine.

The nicotinic acetylcholine receptors (nAChRs) are members of a superfamily of ligand-gated ion channels that mediate fast signal transmission at synapses. After binding acetylcholine, these pentameric receptors respond by undergoing an extensive change in conformation that affects all subunits and leads to opening of an ion-conducting channel across the plasma membrane. The protein encoded by this gene is an integral membrane receptor subunit that can interact with either nAChR beta-2 or nAChR beta-4 to form a functional receptor.

Mutations in this gene appear to account for a small proportion of the cases of nocturnal frontal lobe epilepsy. It has also been associated with a rare form of movement disorder characterised by dyskinesia during periods of exercise or activity called paroxysmal kinesogenic dyskinesia.

== Interactive pathway map ==
Click on genes, proteins and metabolites below to link to respective articles. (Note: The interactive pathway map can be edited at WikiPathways: "NicotineDopaminergic_WP1602".)

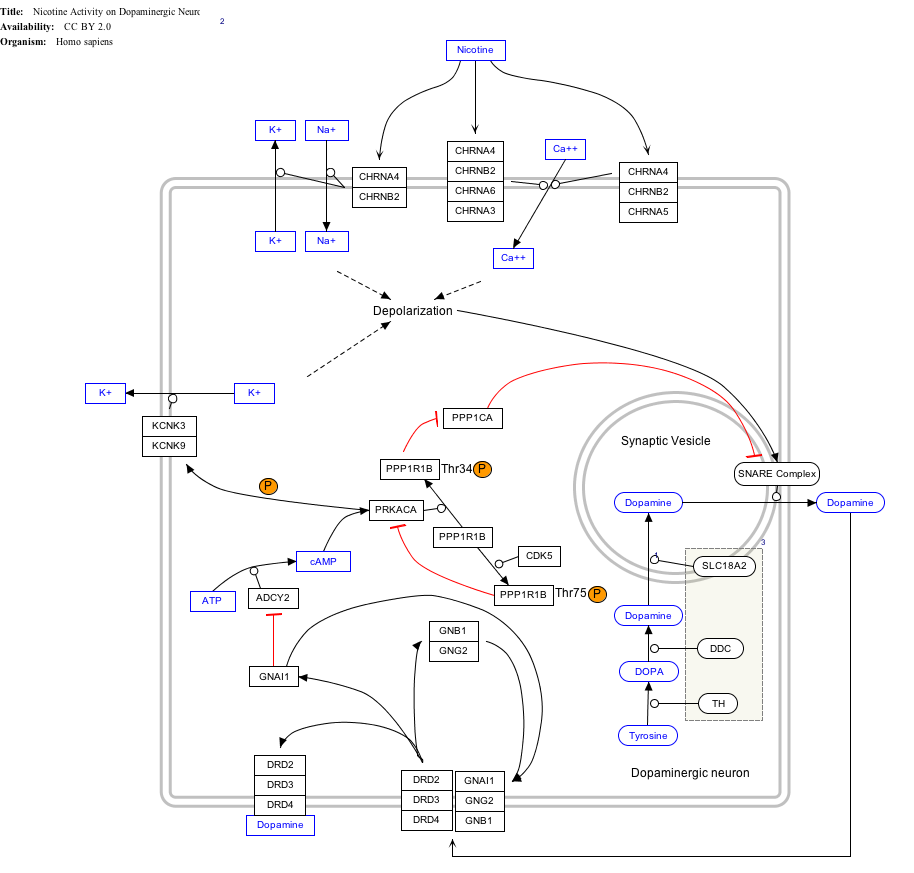

Nicotine Activity on Dopaminergic Neurons edit

== See also ==
- Nicotinic acetylcholine receptor
