= ANO3 =

Protein-coding gene in humans

Identifiers
- Aliases: ANO3, C11orf25, DYT23, DYT24, TMEM16C, GENX-3947, anoctamin 3
- External IDs: OMIM: 610110; MGI: 3613666; GeneCards: ANO3

Gene location (Human)
Chr.	Chromosome 11 (human)
Band	11p14.3-p14.2	Start	26,188,842 bp
Band	11p14.3-p14.2	End	26,663,289 bp

Gene location (Mouse)
Chr.	Chromosome 2 (mouse)
Band	2 E3|2	Start	110,485,546 bp
Band	2 E3|2	End	110,781,268 bp
RNA expression pattern
Bgee	Human / Mouse (ortholog); Top expressed in: corpus epididymis; external globus pallidus; putamen; middle temporal gyrus; Brodmann area 23; caudate nucleus; Region I of hippocampus proper; nucleus accumbens; Brodmann area 46; entorhinal cortex / Top expressed in: superior frontal gyrus; dentate gyrus of hippocampal formation granule cell; lumbar spinal ganglion; olfactory tubercle; visual cortex; primary visual cortex; primary motor cortex; globus pallidus; hippocampus proper; nucleus accumbens; More reference expression data
BioGPS	n/a
Gene ontology
Molecular function	phospholipid scramblase activity; protein dimerization activity; intracellular calcium activated chloride channel activity
Cellular component	integral component of membrane; plasma membrane; membrane
Biological process	calcium activated phosphatidylcholine scrambling; calcium activated galactosylceramide scrambling; ion transmembrane transport; detection of temperature stimulus; lipid transport; detection of mechanical stimulus; calcium activated phospholipid scrambling
Sources:Amigo / QuickGO
Orthologs
Databases	NCBI: entry; OMA: entry
Species	Human	Mouse
Entrez	63982	228432
Ensembl	ENSG00000134343	ENSMUSG00000074968
UniProt	Q9BYT9	A2AHL1
RefSeq (mRNA)	NM_001313726; NM_001313727; NM_031418	NM_001081556; NM_001128103; NM_001355244; NM_001355245; NM_001355246
RefSeq (protein)	NP_001300655; NP_001300656; NP_113606	NP_001121575; NP_001342173; NP_001342174; NP_001342175
Location (UCSC)	Chr 11: 26.19 – 26.66 Mb	Chr 2: 110.49 – 110.78 Mb
PubMed search
- Wikidata
View/Edit Human	View/Edit Mouse

ANO3 is a gene that in humans is located on chromosome 11 and encodes the protein anoctamin 3. It belongs to a family of genes (ANO1–ANO10) that appear to encode calcium-activated chloride channels.

== Clinical significance ==
Mutations in ANO3 have been linked to a form of autosomal dominant cranio-cervical dystonia (also known as DYT23), which presents as abnormal twisting or tremulous movements of the face, voice, head and upper limbs.
