= Benign infantile epilepsy =

Syndrome manifested by focal seizures during childhood

Benign infantile epilepsy (BIE), also known as benign infantile seizures (BIS), is an epilepsy syndrome of which several forms have been described. The International League Against Epilepsy (ILAE) classify two main forms of the syndrome (familial and nonfamilial) though several other forms have been described in the academic literature. Affected children, who have no other health or developmental problems, develop seizures during infancy. These seizures have focal origin within the brain but may then spread to become generalized seizures. The seizures may occur several times a day, often grouped in clusters over one to three days followed by a gap of one to three months. Treatment with anticonvulsant drugs is not necessary but they are often prescribed and are effective at controlling the seizures. Sodium channel blockers in particular have been shown to be effective for benign infantile epilepsy. Levitiracetam, otherwise known as Keppra, has been associated with higher rates of seizure freedom than other forms of anti-epileptics.

This form of epilepsy resolves after one or two years, and appears to be completely benign. The EEG of these children, between seizures, is normal. The brain appears normal on MRI scan.

The familial and nonfamilial forms have overlapping features and the presence of a family history of infantile seizures may be the only distinguishing criterion. The nonfamiliar form has a larger range of the onset of seizures: from three to twenty months with most occurring between five and six months. There is no difference between the sexes. With benign familial infantile epilepsy, the seizures onset from four to eight months of age.

Some cases of nonfamilial benign infantile seizures occur during a case of mild gastroenteritis. Called benign infantile seizures associated with mild gastroenteritis (BIS with MG), the seizures only occur during this illness and do not recur. Infection with rotavirus is the most common cause.

Although children with benign infantile epilepsy typically have a normal EEG between seizures, some infants have been found to have a characteristic abnormal EEG during sleep. Called benign infantile focal epilepsy with midline spikes and waves during sleep, these infants have few seizures and there may often be a family history.

For treatment, anticonvulsant medications, such as levetiracetam, have been found to reduce seizure frequency and even lead to seizure freedom in some infants but the strength of the evidence remains low. In addition to levetiracetam, it has been found that dietary changes such as the ketogenic diet and the modified Atkins diet can reduce seizure frequency. Surgical interventions including hemispherectomy/hemispherotomy have been shown to improve seizure recurrence, leading to seizure freedom in some infants as well.
