= SGCE =

Protein-coding gene in the species Homo sapiens

Identifiers
- Aliases: SGCE, DYT11, ESG, sarcoglycan epsilon, epsilon-SG
- External IDs: OMIM: 604149; MGI: 1329042; GeneCards: SGCE

Gene location (Human)
Chr.	Chromosome 7 (human)
Band	7q21.3	Start	94,524,204 bp
Band	7q21.3	End	94,656,572 bp

Gene location (Mouse)
Chr.	Chromosome 6 (mouse)
Band	6 A1|6 1.81 cM	Start	4,674,350 bp
Band	6 A1|6 1.81 cM	End	4,747,207 bp
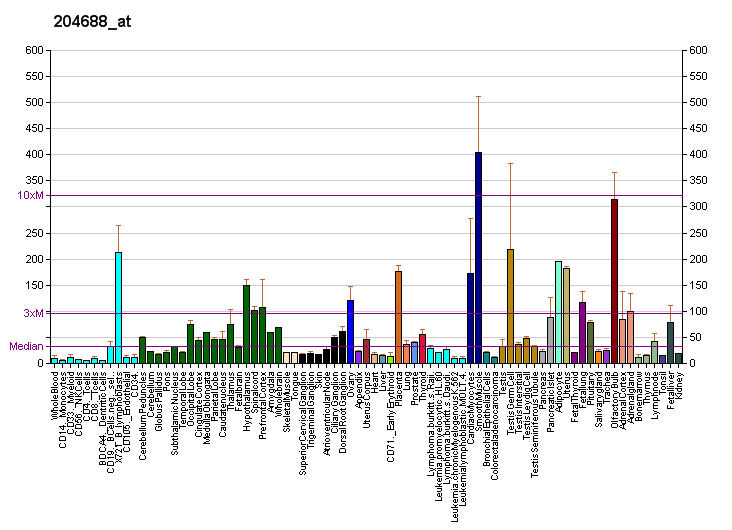
RNA expression pattern
Bgee	Human / Mouse (ortholog); Top expressed in: tendon of biceps brachii; left ovary; right ovary; Achilles tendon; left adrenal gland; left adrenal cortex; tibial nerve; Descending thoracic aorta; right adrenal gland; ascending aorta / Top expressed in: sciatic nerve; iris; white adipose tissue; umbilical cord; carotid body; adrenal gland; vestibular sensory epithelium; right lung lobe; efferent ductule; epididymis; More reference expression data
BioGPS	More reference expression data
Gene ontology
Molecular function	protein binding
Cellular component	cytoplasm; integral component of membrane; plasma membrane; Golgi apparatus; dendrite; sarcolemma; integral component of plasma membrane; dystrophin-associated glycoprotein complex; sarcoglycan complex; cell projection; cytoskeleton; dendrite membrane; membrane
Biological process	muscle organ development; cell-matrix adhesion; muscle system process; membrane organization; skeletal muscle tissue development
Sources:Amigo / QuickGO
Orthologs
Databases	NCBI: entry; OMA: entry
Species	Human	Mouse
Entrez	8910	20392
Ensembl	ENSG00000127990	ENSMUSG00000004631
UniProt	O43556	O70258
RefSeq (mRNA)	NM_001099400; NM_001099401; NM_001301139; NM_003919; NM_001346713 NM_001346715; NM_001346717; NM_001346719; NM_001346720; NM_001362807; NM_001362808; NM_001362809	NM_001130188; NM_001130189; NM_001130190; NM_001130191; NM_011360
RefSeq (protein)	NP_001092870; NP_001092871; NP_001288068; NP_001333642; NP_001333644 NP_001333646; NP_001333648; NP_001333649; NP_003910; NP_001349736; NP_001349737; NP_001349738	NP_001123660; NP_001123661; NP_001123662; NP_001123663; NP_035490
Location (UCSC)	Chr 7: 94.52 – 94.66 Mb	Chr 6: 4.67 – 4.75 Mb
PubMed search
- Wikidata
View/Edit Human	View/Edit Mouse

Epsilon-sarcoglycan is a protein that in humans is encoded by the SGCE gene.

The SGCE gene encodes the epsilon member of the sarcoglycan family, transmembrane components of the dystrophin-glycoprotein complex, which links the cytoskeleton to the extracellular matrix.[supplied by OMIM].

== Clinical significance ==
Mutations in the SGCE gene are known to cause myoclonic dystonia (DTY11).
