= HIRIP3 =

Protein-coding gene in the species Homo sapiens

Identifiers
- Aliases: HIRIP3, HIRA interacting protein 3
- External IDs: OMIM: 603365; MGI: 2142364; HomoloGene: 18218; GeneCards: HIRIP3; OMA:HIRIP3 - orthologs

Gene location (Human)
| Chr. | Chromosome 16 (human) |
| Band | 16p11.2 | Start | 29,992,330 bp |
| Band | 16p11.2 | End | 29,996,074 bp |

Gene location (Mouse)
| Chr. | Chromosome 7 (mouse) |
| Band | 7|7 F3 | Start | 126,461,144 bp |
| Band | 7|7 F3 | End | 126,464,549 bp |
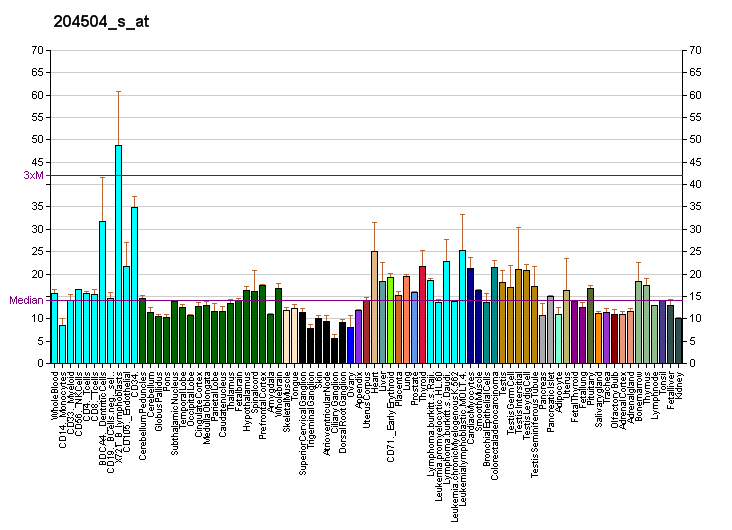
RNA expression pattern
| Bgee | Human / Mouse (ortholog); Top expressed in: oocyte; left testis; right testis; ganglionic eminence; ventricular zone; apex of heart; C1 segment; secondary oocyte; gastrocnemius muscle; muscle of thigh / Top expressed in: zygote; otic vesicle; neural layer of retina; secondary oocyte; tail of embryo; hand; ventricular zone; primary oocyte; genital tubercle; epiblast; More reference expression data |
| BioGPS | More reference expression data |
Orthologs
| Species | Human | Mouse |
| Entrez | 8479 | 233876 |
| Ensembl | ENSG00000149929 | ENSMUSG00000042606 |
| UniProt | Q9BW71 | Q8BLH7 |
| RefSeq (mRNA) | NM_003609; NM_001197323 | NM_172746 |
| RefSeq (protein) | NP_001184252; NP_003600 | NP_766334 |
| Location (UCSC) | Chr 16: 29.99 – 30 Mb | Chr 7: 126.46 – 126.46 Mb |
| PubMed search |
- Wikidata
| View/Edit Human | View/Edit Mouse |

HIRA-interacting protein 3 is a protein that in humans is encoded by the HIRIP3 gene.

The HIRA protein shares sequence similarity with Hir1p and Hir2p, the two corepressors of histone gene transcription characterized in the yeast, Saccharomyces cerevisiae. The structural features of the HIRA protein suggest that it may function as part of a protein complex. Recently, several cDNAs encoding HIRA-interacting proteins, or HIRIPs, have been identified. In vitro, the HIRIP3 gene product binds HIRA, as well as H2B and H3 core histones, indicating that a complex containing HIRA-HIRIP3 could function in some aspects of chromatin and histone metabolism.
