= INO80 complex subunit E =

Protein-coding gene in the species Homo sapiens

INO80E

Identifiers
- Aliases: INO80E, CCDC95, INO80 complex subunit E
- External IDs: MGI: 2141881; GeneCards: INO80E

Gene location (Human)
Chr.	Chromosome 16 (human)
Band	16p11.2	Start	29,995,715 bp
Band	16p11.2	End	30,005,793 bp

Gene location (Mouse)
Chr.	Chromosome 7 (mouse)
Band	7|7 F3	Start	126,450,132 bp
Band	7|7 F3	End	126,461,549 bp
RNA expression pattern
Bgee	Human / Mouse (ortholog); Top expressed in: granulocyte; right testis; left testis; right uterine tube; smooth muscle tissue; muscle layer of sigmoid colon; canal of the cervix; body of uterus; right coronary artery; left uterine tube / Top expressed in: spermatocyte; internal carotid artery; ventricular zone; epiblast; external carotid artery; yolk sac; spermatid; tail of embryo; thymus; embryo; More reference expression data
BioGPS	n/a
Gene ontology
Molecular function	protein binding
Cellular component	nucleolus; nucleus; Ino80 complex; nucleoplasm
Biological process	DNA recombination; regulation of transcription, DNA-templated; DNA repair; transcription, DNA-templated; cellular response to DNA damage stimulus; protein deubiquitination; chromatin remodeling
Sources:Amigo / QuickGO
Orthologs
Databases	NCBI: entry; OMA: entry
Species	Human	Mouse
Entrez	283899	233875
Ensembl	ENSG00000169592	ENSMUSG00000030689
UniProt	Q8NBZ0	n/a
RefSeq (mRNA)	NM_001304562; NM_001304563; NM_173618	NM_153580; NM_001370765
RefSeq (protein)	NP_001291491; NP_001291492; NP_775889	n/a
Location (UCSC)	Chr 16: 30 – 30.01 Mb	Chr 7: 126.45 – 126.46 Mb
PubMed search
- Wikidata
View/Edit Human	View/Edit Mouse

INO80 complex subunit E is a protein that in humans is encoded by the INO80E gene.

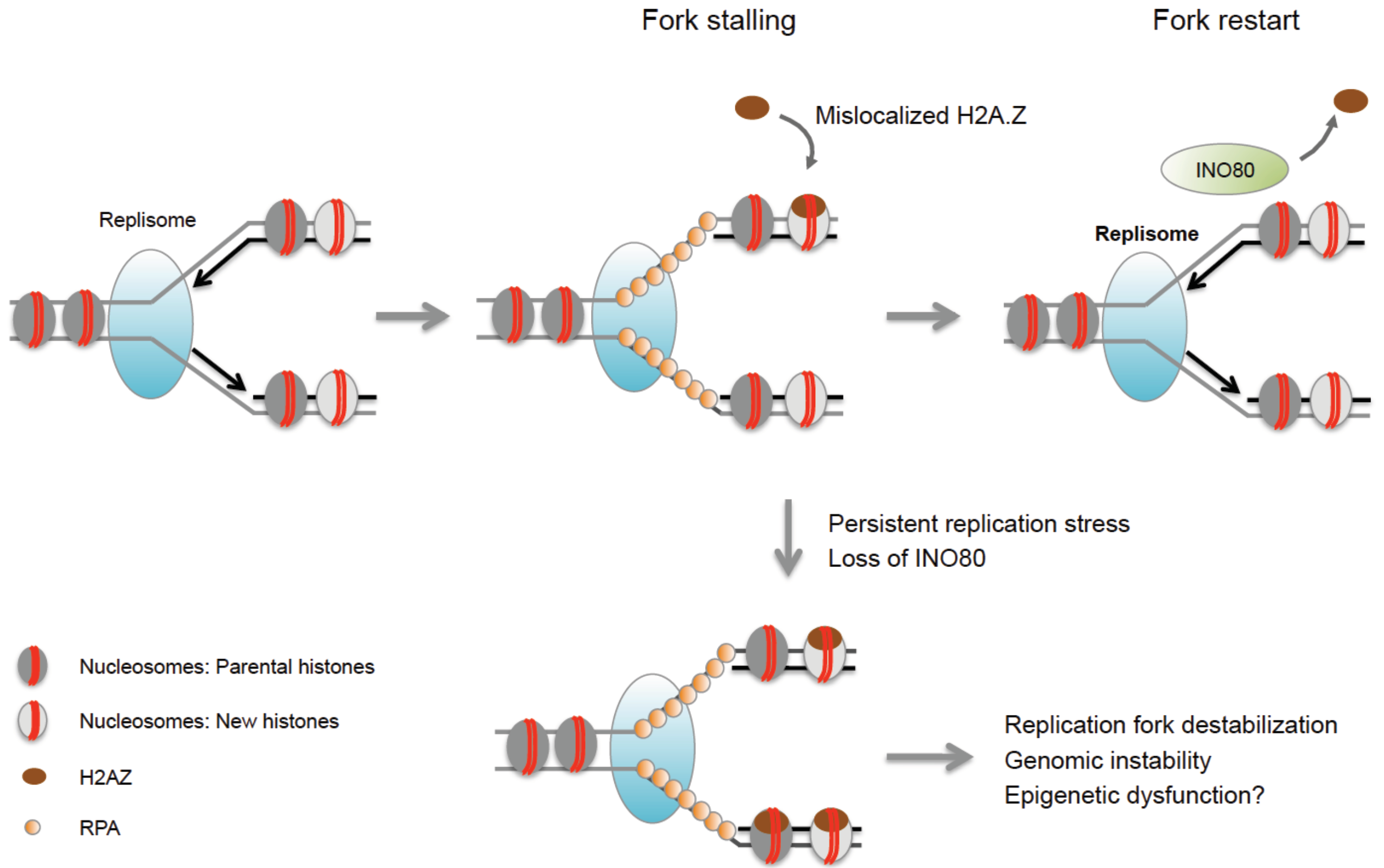
INO80 stabilizes replication forks and counteracts mislocalization of H2A.Z
