= CIZ1 =

Protein-coding gene in humans

Identifiers
- Aliases: CIZ1, LSFR1, NP94, ZNF356, CDKN1A interacting zinc finger protein 1
- External IDs: OMIM: 611420; MGI: 1920234; GeneCards: CIZ1

Gene location (Human)
Chr.	Chromosome 9 (human)
Band	9q34.11	Start	128,161,251 bp
Band	9q34.11	End	128,204,383 bp

Gene location (Mouse)
Chr.	Chromosome 2 (mouse)
Band	2|2 B	Start	32,242,339 bp
Band	2|2 B	End	32,270,982 bp
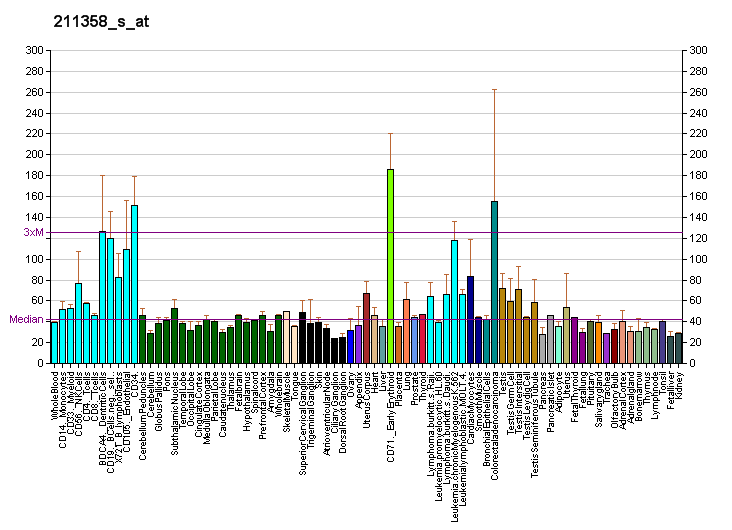

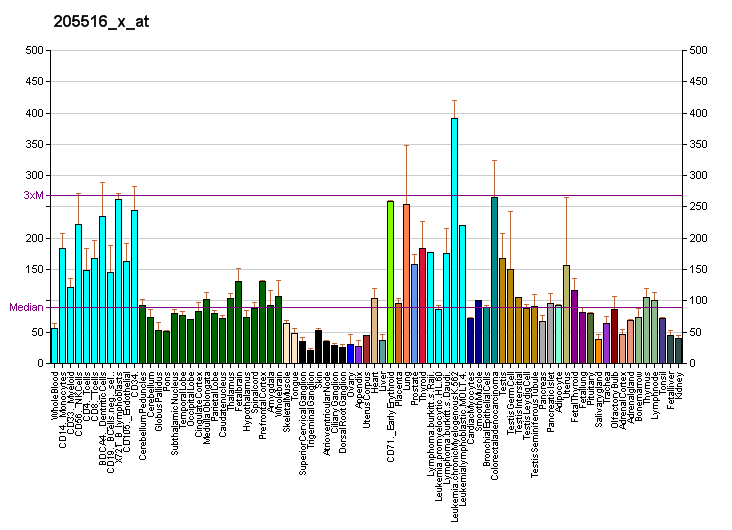

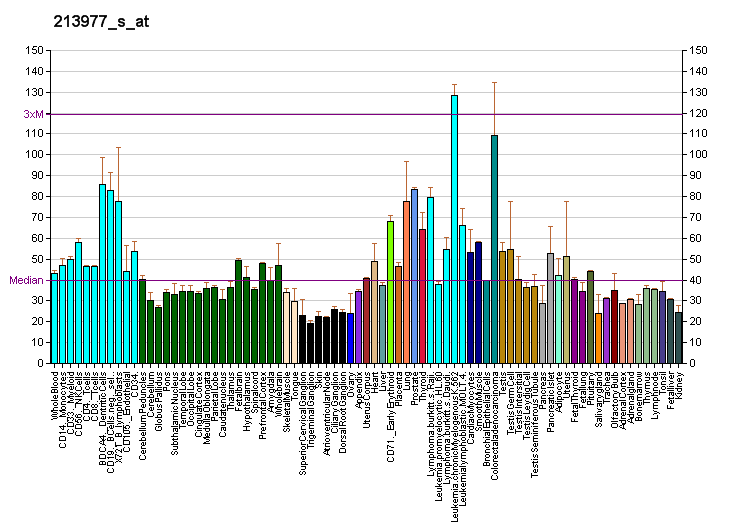
RNA expression pattern
Bgee	Human / Mouse (ortholog); Top expressed in: right hemisphere of cerebellum; left ovary; right ovary; tibial nerve; canal of the cervix; body of pancreas; skin of leg; body of uterus; skin of abdomen; muscle layer of sigmoid colon / Top expressed in: genital tubercle; neural layer of retina; tail of embryo; aortic valve; yolk sac; primary visual cortex; ascending aorta; ventricular zone; muscle of thigh; granulocyte; More reference expression data
BioGPS	More reference expression data
Orthologs
Databases	NCBI: entry; OMA: entry
Species	Human	Mouse
Entrez	25792	68379
Ensembl	ENSG00000148337	ENSMUSG00000039205
UniProt	Q9ULV3	n/a
RefSeq (mRNA)	NM_001131015; NM_001131016; NM_001131017; NM_001131018; NM_001257975 NM_001257976; NM_012127	NM_001252534; NM_001252536; NM_001252537; NM_001252538; NM_028412
RefSeq (protein)	NP_001124487; NP_001124488; NP_001124489; NP_001124490; NP_001244904 NP_001244905; NP_036259	n/a
Location (UCSC)	Chr 9: 128.16 – 128.2 Mb	Chr 2: 32.24 – 32.27 Mb
PubMed search
- Wikidata
View/Edit Human	View/Edit Mouse

Cip1-interacting zinc finger protein is a protein that in humans is encoded by the CIZ1 gene.

== Function ==
The protein encoded by this gene is a zinc finger DNA binding transcription factor that interacts with CIP1 (p21 / CDKN1A), part of a complex with cyclin E. The encoded protein may regulate the cellular localization of CIP1.

== Clinical significance ==
An altered circulating form of the Ciz1 protein is synthesized by lung cancer cells, even when they are at a very early stage. Hence detection of this protein variant in blood could be used as a biomarker for early detection of lung cancer.

== Ciz1 mutant mice ==
Aged (18-mo-old) Ciz1^{-/-} mice have increased neuronal DNA double-strand breaks that likely contributed to their loss of neurons and cognitive decline with age. Embryonic fibroblasts from Ciz1^{-/-} mice show abnormal sensitivity to γ-irradiation with persistent DNA breaks, aberrant cell cycle progression and increased apoptosis.

== Interactions ==
CIZ1 has been shown to interact with P21.
