= Glutathione thiolesterase =

glutathione thiolesterase

Identifiers
- EC no.: 3.1.2.7
- CAS no.: 9025-99-4

Databases
- BRENDA: enzyme data
- ExPASy: NiceZyme view
- KEGG: enzyme entry
- MetaCyc: metabolic pathway
- Rhea: reactions
- PDB structures: RCSB PDB PDBe PDBsum
- Gene Ontology: AmiGO / QuickGO
Search
- PMC: articles
- PubMed: articles
- NCBI: proteins

The enzyme glutathione thiolesterase (EC 3.1.2.7) catalyzes the reaction

S-acylglutathione + H_{2}O $\rightleftharpoons$ glutathione + a carboxylate

This enzyme belongs to the family of hydrolases, specifically those acting on thioester bonds. The systematic name is S-acylglutathione hydrolase. It is also called citryl-glutathione thioesterhydrolase.

Glutathione thiolesterase has also been found to catalyze the reaction

S-lactoylglutathione + H_{2}O $\rightleftharpoons$ glutathione + a lactate

The catalysis of S-lactoylglutathione hydrolysis by glutathione thiolesterase has been noted in Saccharomyces cerevisiae. Additionally, human red blood cells have been found to contain at least four separate glutathione thiol esterases. The enzymes found supported the potential substrate activity of S-lactoylglutathione and S-propionylglutathione.
