= HAGH =

Protein-coding gene in the species Homo sapiens

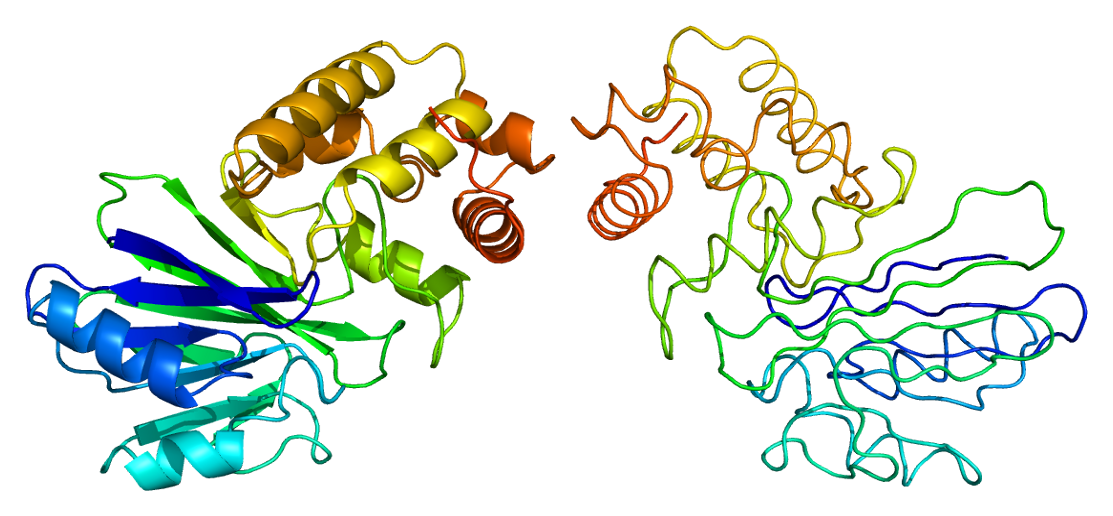

Identifiers
- Aliases: HAGH, GLO2, GLX2, GLXII, HAGH1, hydroxyacylglutathione hydrolase
- External IDs: OMIM: 138760; MGI: 95745; GeneCards: HAGH
Available structures
PDB	Ortholog search: PDBe RCSB
PDB	List of PDB id codes 1QH3, 1QH5
Enzyme activity
EC #	BRENDA	ExPASy	KEGG	MetaCyc
3.1.2.6	↗	↗	↗	↗

Gene location (Human)
Chr.	Chromosome 16 (human)
Band	16p13.3	Start	1,795,620 bp
Band	16p13.3	End	1,827,157 bp

Gene location (Mouse)
Chr.	Chromosome 17 (mouse)
Band	17 A3.3|17 12.53 cM	Start	25,059,117 bp
Band	17 A3.3|17 12.53 cM	End	25,083,424 bp
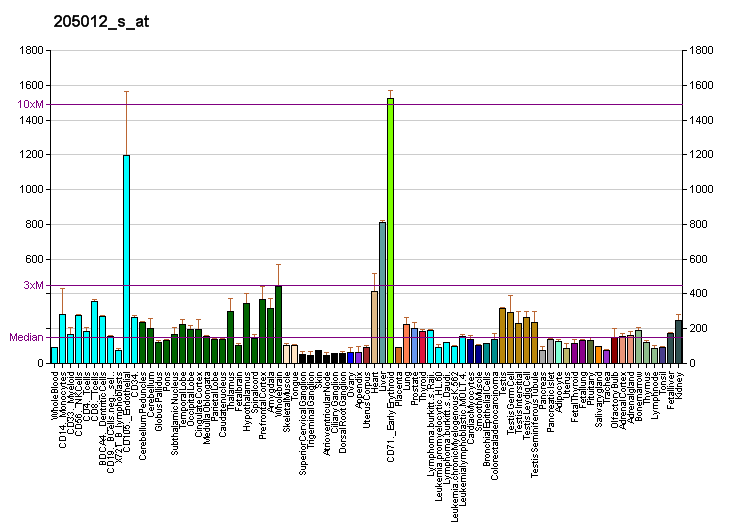
RNA expression pattern
Bgee	Human / Mouse (ortholog); Top expressed in: apex of heart; right lobe of liver; right adrenal gland; right adrenal cortex; left adrenal gland; gastrocnemius muscle; left adrenal cortex; prefrontal cortex; muscle of thigh; left testis / Top expressed in: spermatid; right kidney; spermatocyte; left lobe of liver; blood; proximal tubule; seminiferous tubule; human kidney; facial motor nucleus; tibiofemoral joint; More reference expression data
BioGPS	More reference expression data
Gene ontology
Molecular function	hydroxyacylglutathione hydrolase activity; protein binding; hydrolase activity; metal ion binding
Cellular component	cytoplasm; cytosol; mitochondrial matrix; mitochondrion
Biological process	methylglyoxal catabolic process to D-lactate via S-lactoyl-glutathione; glutathione biosynthetic process; pyruvate metabolic process
Sources:Amigo / QuickGO
Orthologs
Databases	NCBI: entry; OMA: entry
Species	Human	Mouse
Entrez	3029	14651
Ensembl	ENSG00000063854	ENSMUSG00000024158
UniProt	Q16775	Q99KB8
RefSeq (mRNA)	NM_001040427; NM_001286249; NM_005326; NM_001363912; NM_001363914	NM_001159626; NM_024284
RefSeq (protein)	NP_001035517; NP_001273178; NP_005317; NP_001350841; NP_001350843	NP_001153098; NP_077246
Location (UCSC)	Chr 16: 1.8 – 1.83 Mb	Chr 17: 25.06 – 25.08 Mb
PubMed search
- Wikidata
View/Edit Human	View/Edit Mouse

Hydroxyacylglutathione hydrolase, mitochondrial is an enzyme that in humans is encoded by the HAGH gene.

The enzyme encoded by this gene is classified as a thiolesterase and is responsible for the hydrolysis of S-lactoyl-glutathione to reduced glutathione and D-lactate.
