= TLCD3B =

Protein-coding gene in the species Homo sapiens

Identifiers
- Aliases: TLCD3B, FP1188, family with sequence similarity 57 member B, FAM57B, TLC domain ceramide synthase 3B, TLC domain containing 3B, CORD22
- External IDs: OMIM: 615175; MGI: 1916202; GeneCards: TLCD3B

Gene location (Human)
Chr.	Chromosome 16 (human)
Band	16p11.2	Start	30,024,427 bp
Band	16p11.2	End	30,052,978 bp

Gene location (Mouse)
Chr.	Chromosome 7 (mouse)
Band	7|7 F3	Start	126,396,840 bp
Band	7|7 F3	End	126,429,391 bp
RNA expression pattern
Bgee	Human / Mouse (ortholog); Top expressed in: left testis; right testis; right hemisphere of cerebellum; ganglionic eminence; vena cava; right frontal lobe; pons; cingulate gyrus; anterior cingulate cortex; prefrontal cortex / Top expressed in: neural layer of retina; Rostral migratory stream; deep cerebellar nuclei; retinal pigment epithelium; pontine nuclei; cerebellar vermis; lobe of cerebellum; medial vestibular nucleus; inferior colliculi; epithelium of lens; More reference expression data
BioGPS	n/a
Gene ontology
Molecular function	sphingosine N-acyltransferase activity
Cellular component	integral component of membrane; Golgi membrane; Golgi apparatus; endoplasmic reticulum membrane; endoplasmic reticulum; membrane
Biological process	ceramide biosynthetic process; negative regulation of fat cell differentiation; lipid metabolism
Sources:Amigo / QuickGO
Orthologs
Databases	NCBI: entry; OMA: entry
Species	Human	Mouse
Entrez	83723	68952
Ensembl	ENSG00000149926	ENSMUSG00000058966
UniProt	Q71RH2	Q7TNV1
RefSeq (mRNA)	NM_031478; NM_001318504; NM_001352173	NM_001146347; NM_026884; NM_029978
RefSeq (protein)	NP_001305433; NP_113666; NP_001339102	NP_001139819; NP_081160; NP_084254
Location (UCSC)	Chr 16: 30.02 – 30.05 Mb	Chr 7: 126.4 – 126.43 Mb
PubMed search
- Wikidata
View/Edit Human	View/Edit Mouse

TLC domain containing 3B is a protein that, in humans, is encoded by the TLCD3B gene (previously FAM57B). The TLCD3B protein is a transmembrane protein which may be a target of the nuclear receptor PPARG. There have also been predictions based on similarity to other genes that it may act as a ceramide synthase.
