= PRRT2 =

Protein-coding gene in humans

Identifiers
- Aliases: PRRT2, BFIC2, BFIS2, DSPB3, DYT10, EKD1, FICCA, ICCA, IFITMD1, PKC, proline rich transmembrane protein 2
- External IDs: OMIM: 614386; MGI: 1916267; GeneCards: PRRT2

Gene location (Human)
Chr.	Chromosome 16 (human)
Band	16p11.2	Start	29,811,382 bp
Band	16p11.2	End	29,815,892 bp

Gene location (Mouse)
Chr.	Chromosome 7 (mouse)
Band	7|7 F3	Start	127,017,531 bp
Band	7|7 F3	End	127,021,211 bp
RNA expression pattern
Bgee	Human / Mouse (ortholog); Top expressed in: right hemisphere of cerebellum; cerebellar vermis; right frontal lobe; Brodmann area 9; primary visual cortex; middle temporal gyrus; prefrontal cortex; superior frontal gyrus; nucleus accumbens; cingulate gyrus / Top expressed in: cerebellar cortex; primary visual cortex; superior frontal gyrus; dentate gyrus of hippocampal formation granule cell; hippocampus proper; striatum of neuraxis; hypothalamus; morula; neural layer of retina; olfactory bulb; More reference expression data
BioGPS	n/a
Gene ontology
Molecular function	syntaxin-1 binding; SH3 domain binding
Cellular component	integral component of membrane; cell junction; synapse; plasma membrane; membrane; synaptic vesicle; vesicle; axon terminus; presynapse; postsynaptic density; axon; synaptic vesicle membrane; cytoplasmic vesicle; presynaptic membrane; cell projection; dendritic spine; postsynaptic membrane; neuron projection; glutamatergic synapse; integral component of presynaptic membrane
Biological process	neuromuscular process controlling posture; response to biotic stimulus; synaptic vesicle fusion to presynaptic active zone membrane; negative regulation of SNARE complex assembly; negative regulation of short-term synaptic potentiation; calcium-dependent activation of synaptic vesicle fusion
Sources:Amigo / QuickGO
Orthologs
Databases	NCBI: entry; OMA: entry
Species	Human	Mouse
Entrez	112476	69017
Ensembl	ENSG00000167371	ENSMUSG00000045114
UniProt	Q7Z6L0	E9PUL5
RefSeq (mRNA)	NM_001256442; NM_001256443; NM_145239	NM_001102563
RefSeq (protein)	NP_001243371; NP_001243372; NP_660282	NP_001096033
Location (UCSC)	Chr 16: 29.81 – 29.82 Mb	Chr 7: 127.02 – 127.02 Mb
PubMed search
- Wikidata
View/Edit Human	View/Edit Mouse

Proline-rich transmembrane protein 2 is a protein that in humans is encoded by the PRRT2 gene.

== Structure and tissue distribution ==
This gene encodes a transmembrane protein containing a proline-rich domain in its N-terminal half. Studies in mice suggest that it is predominantly expressed in brain and spinal cord in embryonic and postnatal stages.

== Clinical significance ==
Mutations in this gene are associated with a number of movement disorders, most commonly paroxysmal kinesigenic dyskinesia where approximately 1/3 of cases will harbor mutations in PRRT2. It has also been associated with episodic ataxias, and in particular in combination with various types of epilepsy. Mutations in PRRT2 lead also to hemiplegic migraine.

== See also ==
- Paroxysmal kinesogenic choreoathetosis
- Hemiplegic migraine
