= Paroxysmal nonkinesigenic dyskinesia =

Paroxysmal Nonkinesigenic Dyskinesia
- Other names: PNKD, Paroxysmal dystonic choreoathetosis, PDC, Mount-Reback syndrome, Nonkinesigenic choreoathetosis, Familial paroxysmal choreoathetosis, FPD1, DYT8
- Specialty: Neurology
- Frequency: 0.0005%

Paroxysmal nonkinesigenic dyskinesia (PNKD) is an episodic movement disorder first described by Mount and Reback in 1940 under the name "Familial paroxysmal choreoathetosis". It is a rare hereditary disease that affects various muscular and nervous systems in the body, passing to roughly fifty percent of the offspring.

== Signs and symptoms ==
The condition manifests itself as attacks lasting from a few minutes to several hours. Episodes only happen when the individual is awake, and they remain conscious throughout the attack. Symptoms are most severe in youth and lessen with age. Sufferers can have multiple attacks on a daily basis or may have periods of weeks or months between attacks. Symptoms experienced during attacks can vary and include dystonia, chorea, athetosis, ballismus, or a combination.

== Genetics ==
It has been mapped to chromosome 2q31-36.

It has been associated with PNKD.

== Risk triggers ==
While not the same in all people, there are several common triggers that can precipitate an attack:

- Moderate to high consumption of stimulants, such as alcohol, caffeine, or nicotine.
- Low amounts of energy due to hunger, lack of sleep, illness, or physical fatigue.
- Moderate to high presence of stress.
- Menstruation and ovulation.

== Treatment ==
Most pharmacological treatments work poorly, but the best treatment is a low dosage of clonazepam, a muscle relaxant. Patients may also benefit from other benzodiazepines, phenobarbital, and other anticonvulsants such as valproic acid. Affected individuals have reported garlic to be effective for softening the attacks, but no studies have been done on this.
