= Junctophilin =

Junctophilin (JPH, JP) is a protein and associated gene, and may refer to:

- JPH1 (JP-1), Junctophilin-1; the gene and the protein it encodes for
- JPH2 (JP-2), Junctophilin-2; the gene and the protein it encodes for
- JPH3 (JP-3), Junctophilin-3; the gene and the protein it encodes for
- JPH4 (JP-4), Junctophilin-4; the gene and the protein it encodes for
