= Chorea gravidarum =

- Specialty: Neurology, obstetrics

Chorea gravidarum is a rare type of chorea which presents with involuntary abnormal movement, characterized by abrupt, brief, nonrhythmic, nonrepetitive movement of any limb, often associated with nonpatterned facial grimaces. It is a complication of pregnancy which can be associated with eclampsia and its effects upon the basal ganglia. It is not a causal or pathologically distinct entity but a generic term for chorea of any cause starting during pregnancy. It is associated with history of Sydenham's chorea. It mostly occurs in young patients; the average age is 22 years.

Recently there has been a decline in incidence which is probably the result of a decline in rheumatic fever (RF), which was a major cause of chorea gravidarum before the use of antibiotics for streptococcal pharyngitis.

== Pathophysiology ==
Several pathogenetic mechanisms for chorea gravidarum have been offered, but none have been proven. History of either rheumatic fever or chorea is suspected: the suggestion is that estrogens and progesterone may sensitize dopamine receptors (presumably at a striatal level) and induce chorea in individuals who are vulnerable to this complication by virtue of preexisting pathology in the basal ganglia. The relation to rheumatic fever was strengthened by many studies that showed that women with normal pregnancies before rheumatic fever developed chorea in subsequent pregnancies. At least 35% of patients have a definite history of acute rheumatic fever and Sydenham chorea; 4% of those with chorea gravidarum had acute rheumatic fever.

It has been suggested that use of oral contraceptives is an infrequent cause of chorea. A patient developed this chorea with no definite evidence of previous Sydenham's chorea or recent streptococcal infections, but had anti-basal ganglia antibodies, suggesting immunological basis for the pathophysiology of this chorea.

== Diagnosis ==
=== Differential diagnoses ===
- Pelizaeus–Merzbacher disease
- Pantothenate kinase-associated neurodegeneration
- Ramsay Hunt syndrome
- Huntington's disease
- Striatonigral degeneration
- Lesch–Nyhan syndrome
- Systemic lupus erythematosus
- Lyme disease
- Torticollis
- Multiple system atrophy
- Tourette syndrome and other tic disorders
- Neuroacanthocytosis
- Viral encephalitis
- Neuronal ceroid lipofuscinosis
- Wilson's disease
- Olivopontocerebellar atrophy
- Familial paroxysmal choreoathetosis
- Benign hereditary chorea

Chorea can also be a manifestation of drug toxicity (for example, anticonvulsants, antiparkinson agents, neuroleptics, steroids, and estrogen), or a result of an infectious disease such as meningovascular syphilis, Lyme disease, viral encephalitis, and many others.

== Treatment ==
Drug treatment is indicated for patients with severe disabling chorea. It is treated with haloperidol, chlorpromazine alone or in combination with diazepam, and also pimozide, which is another neuroleptic drug which may have fewer adverse effects than haloperidol. Valproic acid, chloral hydrate, risperidone, or phenobarbital can also be used.

== See also ==
- Chorea
