= Huntington's disease-like syndrome =

- Other names: HDL syndrome
- Specialty: Neurology

Huntington's disease-like syndromes (HD-like syndromes, or HDL syndromes) are a family of inherited neurodegenerative diseases that closely resemble Huntington's disease (HD) in that they typically produce a combination of chorea, cognitive decline or dementia and behavioural or psychiatric problems.

== Types ==
=== HDL1 ===
HDL1 is an unusual, autosomal dominant familial prion disease. Only described in one family, it is caused by an eight-octapeptide repeat insertion in the PRNP gene. More broadly, inherited prion diseases in general can mimic HD.

=== HDL2 ===
HDL2 is the most common HD-like syndrome and is caused by CTG/CAG triplet expansions in the JPH3 gene encoding junctophilin-3. It is almost exclusively restricted to populations of African descent and is actually more common than Huntington's disease in Black South Africans. Full penetrance occurs in people with 40 repeats or more. A South African study in 2024 examined eight individuals with HDL2 and found their repeat numbers varied from 45 to 63, with the median number being 52. The same study found that increasing repeat number is correlated with greater cognitive and behavioural impairment, but less chorea.

=== HDL3 ===
HDL3 is a rare, autosomal recessive disorder linked to chromosome 4p15.3. It has only been reported in two families, and the causative gene is unidentified.

=== Other ===
Other neurogenetic disorders can cause an HD-like or HD phenocopy syndrome but are not solely defined as HDL syndromes. The most common is spinocerebellar ataxia type 17 (SCA-17), occasionally called HDL-4. Others include mutations in C9orf72, spinocerebellar ataxias type 1 and 3, neuroacanthocytosis, dentatorubral-pallidoluysian atrophy (DRPLA), brain iron accumulation disorders, Wilson's disease, benign hereditary chorea, Friedreich's ataxia and mitochondrial diseases.

A Huntington's disease-like presentation may also be caused by acquired causes.
