= JPH2 =

Protein-coding gene in the species Homo sapiens

Identifiers
- Aliases: JPH2, CMH17, JP-2, JP2, junctophilin 2, CMD2E
- External IDs: OMIM: 605267; MGI: 1891496; GeneCards: JPH2

Gene location (Human)
Chr.	Chromosome 20 (human)
Band	20q13.12	Start	44,106,590 bp
Band	20q13.12	End	44,187,188 bp

Gene location (Mouse)
Chr.	Chromosome 2 (mouse)
Band	2|2 H3	Start	163,178,162 bp
Band	2|2 H3	End	163,239,913 bp
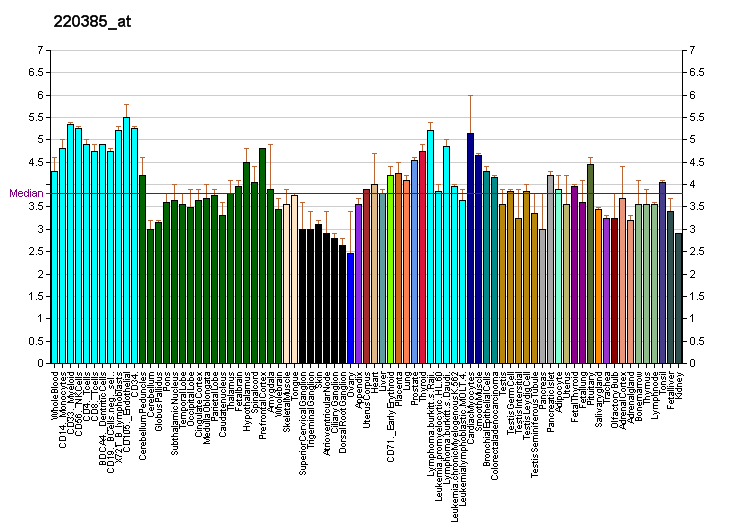

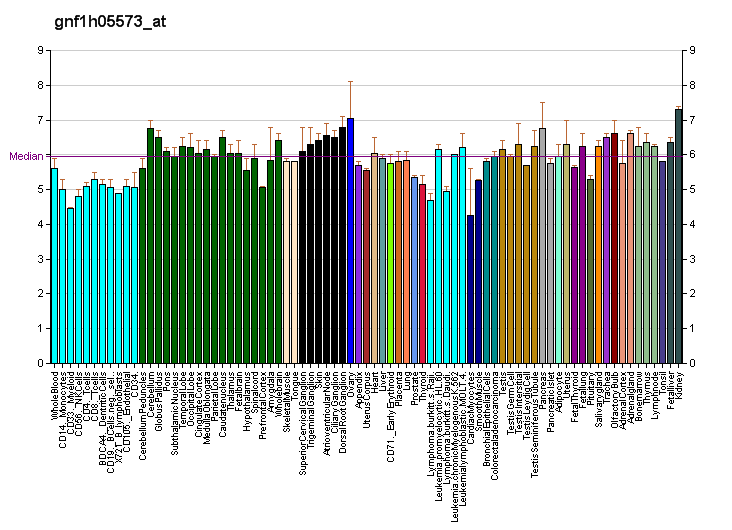
RNA expression pattern
Bgee	Human / Mouse (ortholog); Top expressed in: myocardium of left ventricle; Skeletal muscle tissue of rectus abdominis; tibialis anterior muscle; cardiac muscle tissue of right atrium; muscle of thigh; Skeletal muscle tissue of biceps brachii; apex of heart; quadriceps femoris muscle; vastus lateralis muscle; popliteal artery / Top expressed in: muscle of thigh; triceps brachii muscle; sternocleidomastoid muscle; temporal muscle; skeletal muscle tissue; ankle; digastric muscle; interventricular septum; myocardium of ventricle; extraocular muscle; More reference expression data
BioGPS	More reference expression data
Gene ontology
Molecular function	phosphatidic acid binding; phosphatidylinositol-4-phosphate binding; phosphatidylinositol-5-phosphate binding; phosphatidylserine binding; phosphatidylinositol-3,4,5-trisphosphate binding; protein binding; phosphatidylinositol-3,5-bisphosphate binding; phosphatidylinositol-4,5-bisphosphate binding; phosphatidylinositol-3-phosphate binding; calcium-release channel activity; DNA binding
Cellular component	integral component of membrane; sarcoplasmic reticulum; sarcoplasmic reticulum membrane; junctional membrane complex; membrane; endoplasmic reticulum; plasma membrane; junctional sarcoplasmic reticulum membrane; Z discdkac; endoplasmic reticulum membrane; nucleus
Biological process	regulation of cardiac muscle tissue development; calcium ion transport into cytosol; positive regulation of cytosolic calcium ion concentration; positive regulation of ryanodine-sensitive calcium-release channel activity; calcium ion homeostasis; regulation of ryanodine-sensitive calcium-release channel activity; release of sequestered calcium ion into cytosol; multicellular organism development
Sources:Amigo / QuickGO
Orthologs
Databases	NCBI: entry; OMA: entry
Species	Human	Mouse
Entrez	57158	59091
Ensembl	ENSG00000149596	ENSMUSG00000017817
UniProt	Q9BR39	Q9ET78
RefSeq (mRNA)	NM_020433; NM_175913	NM_001205076; NM_021566; NM_197984
RefSeq (protein)	NP_065166; NP_787109	NP_001192005; NP_067541
Location (UCSC)	Chr 20: 44.11 – 44.19 Mb	Chr 2: 163.18 – 163.24 Mb
PubMed search
- Wikidata
View/Edit Human	View/Edit Mouse

Junctophilin 2, also known as JPH2, is a protein which in humans is encoded by the JPH2 gene. Alternative splicing has been observed at this locus and two variants encoding distinct isoforms are described.

== Function ==
Junctional complexes between the plasma membrane and endoplasmic/sarcoplasmic reticulum are a common feature of all excitable cell types and mediate cross talk between cell surface and intracellular ion channels. The protein encoded by this gene is a component of junctional complexes and is composed of a C-terminal hydrophobic segment spanning the endoplasmic/sarcoplasmic reticulum membrane and a remaining cytoplasmic membrane occupation and recognition nexus (MORN) domain that shows specific affinity for the plasma membrane. JPH2 is a member of the junctophilin gene family (the other members of the family are JPH1, JPH3, and JPH4) and is the predominant isoform in cardiac tissue, but is also expressed with JPH1 in skeletal muscle. The JPH2 protein product plays a critical role in maintaining the spacing a geometry of the cardiac dyad - the space between the plasma membrane and sarcoplasmic reticulum. These cardiac dyads also known as junctional membrane complexes or calcium release units are thought to play a key role in calcium induced calcium release by approximating L-type calcium channels on the plasma membrane and ryanodine receptor type 2 on the sarcoplasmic reticulum. JPH2 also contains an evolutionarily conserved nuclear localization signal and a DNA binding domain. During (heart) disease, stress-activated calpain converts the full length JPH2 into fragments. The N-terminal fragment (including nuclear localization signal and DNA binding domain) is translocated to nucleus and regulates gene transcription.

== Role in Disease ==
Mutations in JPH2 were identified in a cohort of patients with hypertrophic cardiomyopathy who lacked the traditional mutations in sarcomere proteins. JPH2 has been shown to be downregulated in several animal models of heart failure. A JPH2 knock-out mouse model is lethal at embryonic day 10.5, which is around the time when cardiac contractility should initiate. These mice showed abnormal cardiac calcium handling, cardiomyopathy, and altered junctional membrane complex formation.
