= George Huntington =

American physician that discovered eponymous disease (1850–1916)

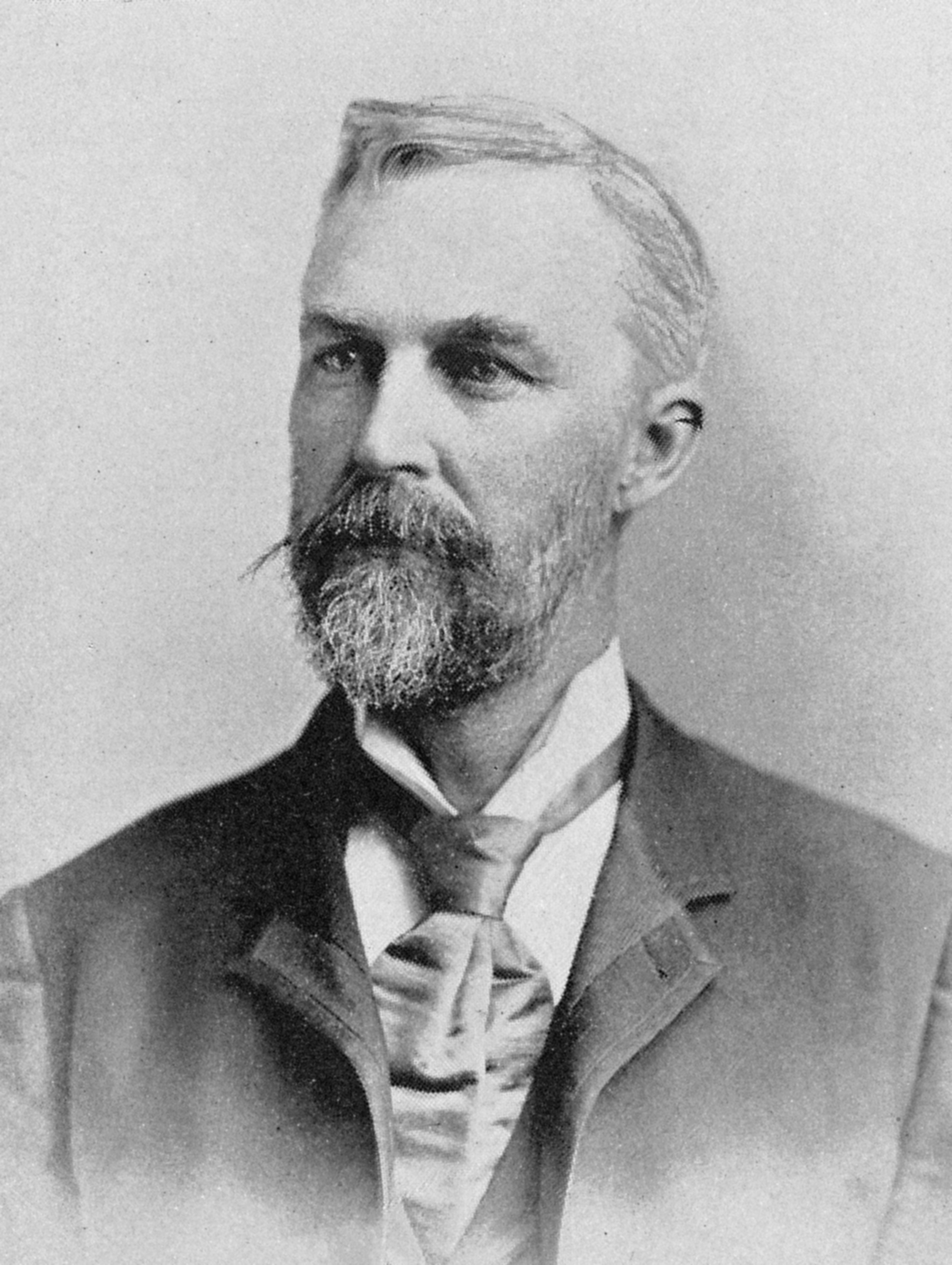
- George Huntington
- Born: April 9, 1850
- Died: March 3, 1916 (aged 65)
- Education: Columbia University
- Occupation: Physician

George Huntington (April 9, 1850 – March 3, 1916) was an American physician who contributed a classic clinical description of the disease that bears his name—Huntington's disease.

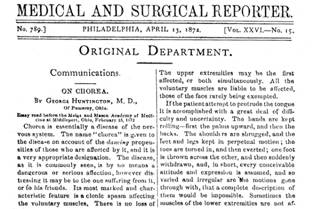
George Huntington's paper

Huntington described this condition in the first of only two scientific papers he ever wrote. He wrote this paper when he was 22, a year after receiving his medical degree from Columbia University in New York. He first read the paper before the Meigs and Mason Academy of Medicine in Middleport, Ohio on February 15, 1872, and then published it in the Medical and Surgical Reporter of Philadelphia on April 13, 1872.

Huntington's father and grandfather, George Lee Huntington (1811–1881) and Abel Huntington (1778–1858), were also physicians in the same family practice. Their longitudinal observations combined with his own were invaluable in precisely describing this hereditary disease in multiple generations of a family in East Hampton on Long Island.

In a 1908 review, the eminent physician William Osler said of this paper: "In the history of medicine, there are few instances in which a disease has been more accurately, more graphically or more briefly described."

In 1874 George Huntington returned to Dutchess County, New York, to practice medicine. He joined a number of medical associations and started working for the Matteawan General Hospital. In 1908 the scientific journal Neurograph dedicated him a special edition.

George Huntington should not be confused with George Sumner Huntington (1861–1927), the anatomist (both men attended the College of Physicians and Surgeons of Columbia University).

== Biography ==
Huntington's father and grandfather, George Lee Huntington (1811–1881) and Abel Huntington (1777–1858), were also physicians. The Huntington family, originally from Connecticut, had lived on Long Island since 1797. That same year his grandfather, Dr. Abel Huntington (1777-1858), opened his general practice in East Hampton, on the Atlantic coast. He married Frances Lee in the same year he opened his practice. His son, George Lee Huntington, who was born there in 1811, studied medicine at New York University and spent the rest of his life working at his father's practice. He married Mary Hogland. His son, George, who would become the family's third medical descendant, was born on April 9, 1850, in East Hampton, a fact that was decisive for his enduring fame in medical history. At an early age George familiarized himself with his father's practice, following him in his rounds and visits to patients as a child.

In 1871, George Huntington got his medical license from Columbia University in New York at the age of 21. His thesis at the College of Physicians and Surgeons was titled Opium.

After graduating, he returned to Long Island from Dutchess County, where he worked for some time with his father. During this period, he was able to better observe the cases of hereditary chorea, which he had seen for the first time with his grandfather and father.

In a lecture he gave to the Neurological Society of New York in 1909, Huntington said:

"Over fifty years ago in riding with my father on his professional rounds, I saw my first cases of 'the disorder,' which was the way in which the natives always referred to the dreaded disease. I recall it as vividly as though it had occurred yesterday. It made a most enduring impression upon my boyish mind, an impression every detail of which I recall today, an impression which was the very first impulse to my choosing chorea as my virgin contribution to medical lore. Driving with my father through a wooded road leading from Easthampton to Amagansett, we suddenly came upon two women, mother and daughter, both bowing, twisting, grimacing. I stared in wonderment, almost in fear. What could it mean? My father paused to speak with them, and we passed on. Then my Gamaliel-like instruction began; my medical instruction had its inception. From this point, my interest in the disease has never wholly ceased."

He took advantage of his father’s and grandfather's notes on the disease that had caught his attention since childhood, and diagnosed many cases. The manuscript of his article about hyperkinesia, in which he described the disease bearing his name, was probably worked on during this time. In an original manuscript preserved by his father, he had made suggestions for reforms and additions. It is likely that Huntington had his unpublished manuscript with him when he left East Hampton.

On February 15, 1872, George Huntington gave his classic presentation on chorea to the Meigs and Mason Academy of Medicine in Middleport, Ohio at only 22 years old. His lecture was met with applause, so he sent the manuscript to the Medical and Surgical Reporter of Philadelphia, where it was published on April 13, 1872. In that lecture he described the disease to the medical community, highlighting three characteristics:

- It was a hereditary disease: "when either or both of the parents have shown manifestations of the disease, and more especially when these manifestations have been of a serious nature, one or more of the offspring almost invariably suffer from the disease, if they live to adult age"
- Those who suffered from it showed suicidal tendencies and dementia: "mind and body both gradually fail until death relieves them of their sufferings"
- The illness manifested itself in adulthood and worsened with age: "these movements gradually increase, when muscles hitherto unaffected take on the spasmodic action, until every muscle in the body becomes affected"

A summary was published in the German literature of Adolf Kussmaul and Carl Wilhelm Hermann Nothnagel in 1872 and, subsequently, the eponym was used more often by European authors. Huntington recognized the hereditary characteristic of the disease, stating in his original document: "when either or both of the parents have shown manifestations of the disease…one or more of the offspring almost invariably suffer from the disease…it never skips a generation to again manifest itself in another; once having yielded its claims, it never regains them."

In a 1908 review article, the eminent physician William Osler said of this paper: "In the history of medicine, there are few instances in which a disease has been more accurately, more graphically or more briefly described." Currently there is a tendency to use the term Huntington's disease rather than Huntington's chorea, but the original title is still very well-known, accepted, and understood.

Jelliffe and Tilney were given the task of tracing the ancestry of affected families, a study that was finished some years later by Vessie (1932). They found that it came from two brothers and their families who had left Bures (in Essex) from Suffolk, England, and later sailed to the Boston Bay in 1630. Over the course of those three centuries, close to 1,000 descendants of the original colonists are known to have arrived with the disease. More than a few of these unlucky people were tried for witchcraft in colonial courts, and also in other ways, were persecuted because their involuntary movements were interpreted as "a derisive pantomime of the sufferings of the Savior during crucifixion."

Progressive and hereditary chorea had been described before 1872. The most complete clinical description, even including the dementia component, was published as early as 1859 by Johan Christian Lind, the doctor from the Setesdal district in Norway. This paper did not get international attention and was certainly not known by Huntington—it wasn't translated into English until 1959, one century after it was published.

In 1874, Huntington transferred to New York and, apart from 2 years in North Carolina, spent the rest of his life practicing medicine in Dutchess County. He retired in 1915.

Huntington married Mary Elizabeth on October 6, 1874. He was a modest and funny man, and they enjoyed hunting, fishing, drawing wildlife, and playing the flute. He was kind and conscientious when practicing medicine, and very loved by his patients. He had a happy family life with five sons, and a great fondness for music, often playing the flute with his wife. Additionally, he was a passionate student of nature and pistols. Drawing was one of his life's interests, and he often drew game birds on his trips through the forest. Here, then, he was a man who enjoyed life to the fullest, and who, because of his intuition and imagination, earned his place in medical history. He practiced medicine until he was 64 years old. He had many periods where he suffered from asthma attacks. Huntington died of pneumonia on March 3, 1916, at 65 years old in his son's house, who was also a doctor, in Cairo, New York.
