= Sydenham's chorea =

Autoimmune disease resulting in uncontrollable jerking motions

- Other names: Rheumatic chorea, chorea minor, St Vitus' dance
- Specialty: Neurology

Sydenham's chorea, also known as rheumatic chorea, is a disorder characterized by rapid, uncoordinated jerking movements primarily affecting the face, hands and feet. Sydenham's chorea is an autoimmune disease that results from childhood infection with Group A beta-haemolytic Streptococcus. It is reported to occur in 20–30% of people with acute rheumatic fever and is one of the major criteria for it, although it sometimes occurs in isolation. The disease occurs typically for a few weeks, but up to 6 months, after the acute infection, which may have been a simple sore throat (pharyngitis).

Sydenham's chorea is more common in females than males, and most cases affect children between 5 and 15 years of age. Adult onset of Sydenham's chorea is comparatively rare, and the majority of the adult cases are recurrences following childhood Sydenham's chorea (although pregnancy and female hormone treatment are also potential causes).

It is historically one of the conditions called St Vitus' dance.

== Signs and symptoms ==
Sydenham's chorea is characterized by the abrupt onset (sometimes within a few hours) of neurological symptoms, classically chorea, which are non-rhythmic, writhing or explosive involuntary movements. Usually all four limbs are affected, but there are cases reported where just one side of the body is affected (hemichorea). Typical chorea includes repeated wrist hyperextension, grimacing, and lip pouting. The fingers can move as if playing the piano. There may be tongue fasciculations ("bag of worms") and motor impersistence, for example, the "milkmaid sign" (grip strength fluctuates, as if hand milking a cow), or inability to sustain tongue protrusion (called jack-in-the-box tongue or serpentine tongue, as the tongue slides in and out of the mouth), or eye closure.

There is usually a loss of fine motor control, which is particularly obvious in handwriting if the child is of school age. Speech is often affected (dysarthria), as is walking; legs will suddenly give way or flick out to one side, giving an irregular gait and the appearance of skipping or dancing. Underlying the abnormal movements is often low tone (hypotonia) which may not become obvious until treatment is started to suppress the chorea. The severity of the condition can vary from just some instability on walking and difficulty with handwriting, to the extreme of being wholly unable to walk, talk, or eat (chorea paralytica).

Movements cease during sleep.

It is a neuropsychiatric disorder, so besides the motor problems there is classically emotional lability (mood swings, or inappropriate mood), but also tics, anxiety, attention deficit etc. These can precede the motor symptoms.

Non-neurologic manifestations of acute rheumatic fever may be present, namely carditis (up to 70% of cases, often subclinical, so echocardiography required), arthritis, erythema marginatum, and subcutaneous nodules.

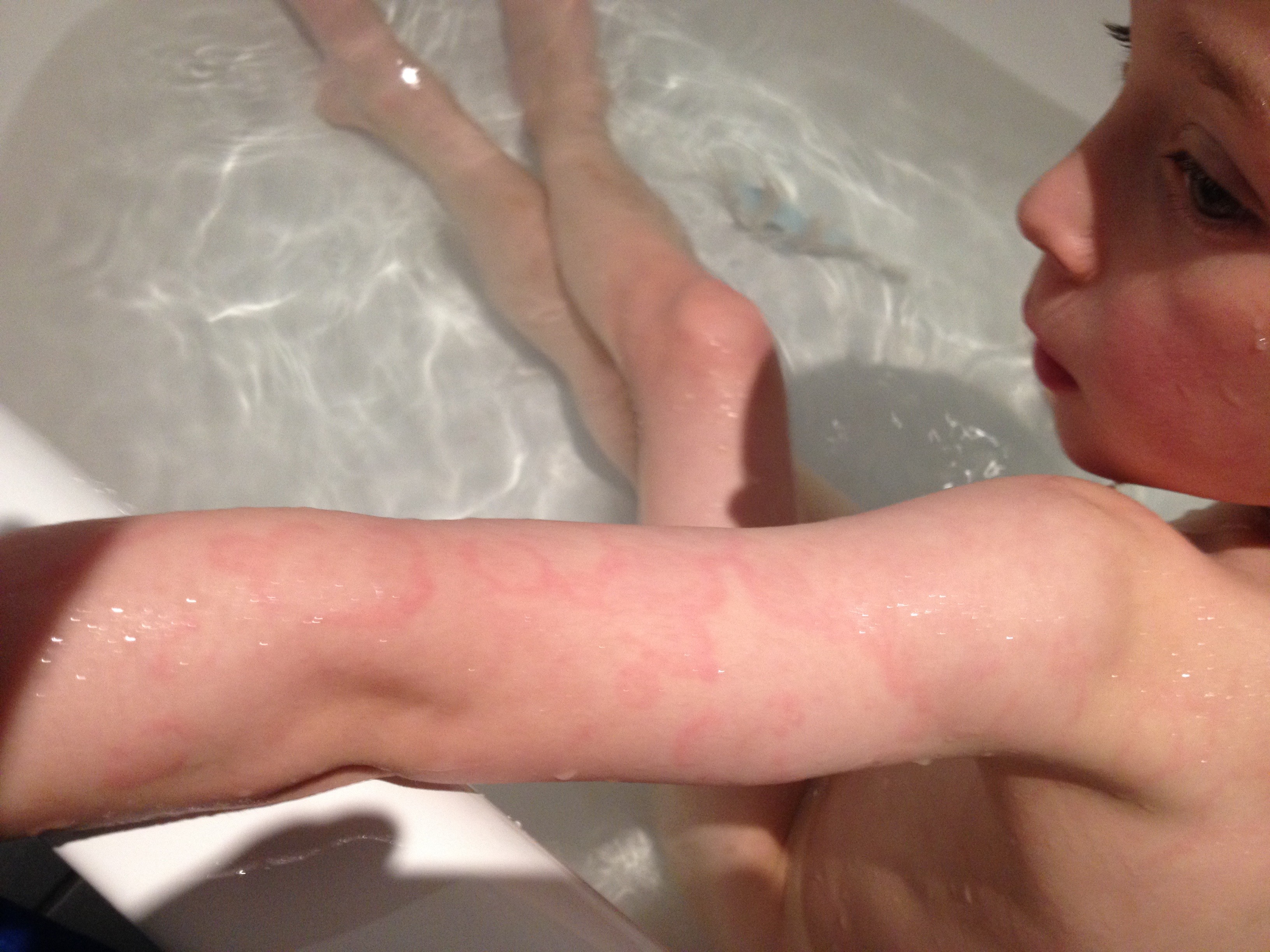
Erythema marginatum

Differentiating these signs from other involuntary movements such as tics and stereotypies can be difficult, and since these things are not uncommon they can potentially co-exist. Diagnosis is often delayed and attributed to another condition such as tic disorder or conversion disorder. The controversial PANDAS (pediatric autoimmune neuropsychiatric disorders associated with streptococcal infections) hypothesis has overlapping clinical features, but Sydenham's chorea is one of the exclusion criteria. PANDAS can present with chorea but more typically there are tics or stereotypies with a psychological component (e.g., OCD).

== Pathology ==
One of the important manifestations of acute rheumatic fever, Sydenham's chorea is believed to be caused by an autoimmune response following infection by group A β-hemolytic streptococci.

Two cross-reactive streptococcal antigens have been identified, the M protein and N-acetyl-beta-D-glucosamine, whereby infection leads to autoantibodies being produced against host tissues (molecular mimicry) causing a variety of streptococcal related diseases including Sydenham's chorea but also rheumatic heart disease and nephritic syndrome. Autoantibodies against basal ganglia proteins have been found in Sydenham's chorea but these are non-specific. Dopamine receptor autoantibodies have been reported to correlate with clinical symptoms. Whether these antibodies represent an epiphenomenon or are pathogenic, remains to be proven.

== Diagnosis ==
Chorea is distinctive, if the health care provider is familiar with it. The diagnosis is then made by the typical acute onset in the weeks following a sore throat or other minor infection, plus evidence of inflammation (raised CRP and/or ESR) and evidence of recent streptococcal infection.

To confirm recent streptococcal infection:

- Throat culture
- Anti-DNAse B titre (peaks at 8–12 weeks after infection)
- Anti-streptolysin O titre (peaks at 3–5 weeks)

None of these tests are 100% reliable, particularly when the infection was some months previously.

Further testing is directed more towards alternative diagnoses and other manifestations of rheumatic fever:

- Echocardiography
- Electroencephalography (EEG)
- Lumbar puncture
- Magnetic resonance imaging or computed tomography (CT) scan of the brain (alterations in caudate nucleus and putaminal enlargement have been described in some patients)

=== Differential diagnosis ===
Other disorders that may be accompanied by chorea include benign hereditary chorea, bilateral striatal necrosis, abetalipoproteinemia, ataxia–telangiectasia, biotin-thiamine-responsive basal ganglia disease (BTBGD), Fahr disease, familial dyskinesia–facial myokymia (Bird–Raskind syndrome) due to an ADCY5 gene mutation, glutaric aciduria, Lesch–Nyhan syndrome, mitochondrial disorders, Huntington's disease, Wilson disease, hyperthyroidism, lupus erythematosus, pregnancy (chorea gravidarum), drug intoxication and side effects of certain anticonvulsants (e.g. phenytoin) or psychotropic agents. Although some of these can similarly present in an acute way, there will typically be other neurological signs (such as ataxia or cognitive impairment), or other disease manifestations, or positive family history, which will help distinguish between them.

== Management ==
Penicillin

Management of Sydenham's chorea is based on the following principles:

- Eliminate the streptococcus – a course of penicillin is usually given at diagnosis to definitively clear any remaining streptococci (and avoid spread of a rheumatogenic clone), but there is no evidence that it makes any difference to the course of the illness.
- Treat the movement disorder
- Immunosuppression
- Prevention of relapses and further cardiac damage
- Manage the disability - Occupational therapy and physiotherapy are useful for maintaining function and muscle tone.

=== Treatment of chorea ===
Treatment with sodium valproate is effective for controlling symptoms, but it does not speed up recovery. Haloperidol was used previously, but caused serious side effects e.g. tardive dyskinesia. Case reports exist to support carbamazepine and levetiracetam; other drugs tried include pimozide, clonidine, and phenobarbitone.

=== Immunosuppression ===
Immunosuppression is used inconsistently in Sydenham's chorea. The model of an autoimmune disorder would support its use. One randomized controlled trial of steroids from Paz, Brazil in 2006 (22 cases) showed remission reduced to 54 days from 119 days. Various other reports of use of oral or IV steroids from Israel, Italy and Brazil. Immunoglobulin has been used in Holland and South Africa. Some improvement can be seen within a few days of IV steroids. In Italy, prednisolone reduced average duration of symptoms from 9 weeks to 4 weeks, and these were severe cases. South African group found less neuropsychiatric complications at 6 months with IVIG treatment (IVIG preferred due to fear of TB reactivation).

=== Relapse prevention ===
Penicillin prophylaxis is essential to treat cardiac features of rheumatic fever, even if subclinical (American Heart Association guideline). If there are not features to warrant a diagnosis of rheumatic fever, it is arguable whether cardiac risk justifies prophylaxis or not; however, it is likely to reduce recurrence.

=== Other treatments ===
There are several historical case series reporting successful treatment of Sydenham's chorea by inducing fever.

== Prognosis ==
Symptoms usually get worse over the course of two weeks, then stabilize, and finally begin to improve. Motor problems, including chorea, settle within an average of 2–3 months.

Recurrence is seen in 16–40% of cases. It is sometimes but not always associated with a rise in ASO titre or other evidence of new streptococcal infection. Recurrence is more likely with poor compliance with penicillin prophylaxis. It is more likely if there is failure to remit within 6 months of onset. Recurrence is associated in women with pregnancy (chorea gravidorum) and with female hormone treatment, although the onset of chorea can be delayed by months or more.

Intramuscular penicillin given every 2–3 weeks is superior to a 4 weekly regime for preventing relapse, but a risk assessment may conclude that twice daily oral penicillin is sufficiently effective, less painful for the child, and less demanding on the family.

Higher recurrence rates are seen with the longest follow up. Relapse can be seen 10 years or more after the initial episode, so might be underestimated by series with shorter follow up. Recurrence is usually only chorea, even if the original case was associated with rheumatic fever. There are two total reports of heart disease worsening after recurrence of chorea. The Thailand study also had 2 cases where carditis, which had improved after initial diagnosis, came back again. Some suggest that recurrent chorea is a different disease altogether.

10% reported long-term tremor in one study (10 years follow up). Long term neuropsychiatric difficulties are increasingly recognized (49 studies so far, especially obsessive-compulsive disorder but also attention-deficit hyperactivity disorder, affective disorders, tic disorders, executive function disturbances, psychotic features, and language impairment).

Heart involvement improves in about a third of cases (whether silent or not).

== History ==
The incidence of acute rheumatic fever and rheumatic heart disease is not declining. Recent figures quote the incidence of Acute Rheumatic Fever as 0.6–0.7/1,000 population in the United States and Japan compared with 15–21/1,000 population in Asia and Africa. The prevalence of Acute Rheumatic Fever and Sydenham's Chorea has declined progressively in developed countries over the last decades.

== Epidemiology ==
Sydenham's chorea is primarily seen in children.

As with rheumatic fever, Sydenham's chorea is seen more often in less affluent communities, whether in the developing world or in aboriginal communities in the global North. High rates of impetigo are a marker for widespread streptococcal transmission.

In the UK, there are approximately 20 cases per year, according to a BPSU surveillance study.

== Etymology ==
It is named after British physician Thomas Sydenham (1624–1689). The alternative eponym, Saint Vitus Dance, is in reference to Saint Vitus, a Christian saint who was persecuted by Roman emperors and died as a martyr in AD 303. Saint Vitus is considered to be the patron saint of dancers, with the eponym given as homage to the manic dancing that historically took place in front of his statue during the feast of Saint Vitus in Germanic and Latvian cultures.
