= JPH =

jph or JPH or variation, may refer to:

== People ==
- Judge of the Preliminary Hearing in the Italian Code of Criminal Procedure

=== Persons ===
- Jph Wacheski, Canadian video game developer and musician
- Jenn Korbee (born 1980, as Jennifer Peterson-Hind, "jph"), U.S. actress singer-songwriter

== Other uses ==
- Jhantipahari railway station (train station code JPH)
- Journal of the Philosophy of History (JPH)
- Junctophilin (JPH), family of proteins and genes

== See also ==
- J. P. H. Acocks (1911–1971), South African botanist
- J.Ph. Sousa (1854–1932), U.S. composer and conductor
- J. Ph. Vogel (1871–1958), Dutch Sanskritist and epigrapher
- Williams JPH1, Formula 2 racecar
