= Saint Vitus' dance =

Saint Vitus' dance, named after Saint Vitus, may refer to:

== Pathologies ==
- Chorea, a movement disorder, specifically either:
  - Sydenham's chorea
  - Huntington disease
- Dancing mania, a Medieval European social phenomenon

== Music ==
- El vito, a traditional folk song and dance music from Andalusia
- "St. Vitus Dance", a song by Bauhaus from In the Flat Field, 1980
- "St. Vitus Dance", a song by Black Sabbath from Vol. 4, 1972
- "Saint Vitus Dance", a song by Louis Jordan, 1941
- "The St. Vitus Dance", an instrumental by Horace Silver from Blowin' the Blues Away, 1959
