= Chorea =

Involuntary movement of the hands or feet

- Specialty: Neurology

Chorea, or (rarely) choreia, (/kəˈriə/) is an abnormal involuntary movement disorder, characterized by quick movements of the hands or feet. It is one of a group of neurological disorders called dyskinesias. The term chorea is derived from Ancient Greek χορεία (choreia) 'dance', as the movements of the body are comparable to dancing.

The term hemichorea refers to chorea of one side of the body, such as chorea of one arm but not both (analogous to hemiballismus).

== Presentation ==
Chorea is characterized by brief, semi-directed, irregular movements that are not repetitive or rhythmic, but appear to flow from one muscle to the next. These 'dance-like' movements of chorea often occur with athetosis, which adds twisting and writhing movements. Walking may become difficult and include odd postures and leg movements. Unlike ataxia, which affects the quality of voluntary movements, or Parkinsonism, which is a hindrance of voluntary movements, the movements of chorea and ballism occur on their own, without conscious effort. Thus, chorea is said to be a hyperkinetic movement disorder. When chorea is serious, slight movements will become thrashing motions; this form of severe chorea is referred to as ballism, or ballismus.

== Causes ==
=== Huntington's disease ===
Huntington's disease is a neurodegenerative disease and most common inherited cause of chorea. The condition was formerly called Huntington's chorea but was renamed because of the important non-choreic features including cognitive decline and behavioural change.

=== Other genetic causes ===
Other genetic causes of chorea are rare. They include the classical Huntington's disease 'mimic' or phenocopy syndromes, called Huntington's disease-like syndrome types 1, 2 and 3; inherited prion disease, the spinocerebellar ataxias type 1, 3 and 17, neuroacanthocytosis, dentatorubral-pallidoluysian atrophy (DRPLA), brain iron accumulation disorders, Wilson's disease, benign hereditary chorea, Friedreich's ataxia, mitochondrial disease and Rett syndrome.

=== Acquired causes ===
The most common acquired causes of chorea are cerebrovascular disease and, in the developing world, HIV infection—usually through its association with cryptococcal disease.

Sydenham's chorea occurs as a complication of streptococcal infection. Twenty percent (20%) of children and adolescents with rheumatic fever develop Sydenham's chorea as a complication. It is increasingly rare, which may be partially due to penicillin, improved social conditions, and/or a natural reduction in the bacteria (Streptococcus) it has stemmed from. Psychological symptoms may precede or accompany this acquired chorea and may be relapsing and remitting. The broader spectrum of paediatric autoimmune neuropsychiatric disorders associated with streptococcal infection can cause chorea and are collectively referred to as PANDAS.

Chorea gravidarum refers to choreic symptoms that occur during pregnancy. If left untreated, the disease resolves in 30% of patients before delivery but, in the other 70%, it persists. The symptoms then progressively disappear in the next few days following the delivery.

Chorea may also be caused by drugs (commonly levodopa, anti-convulsants and anti-psychotics).

Other acquired causes include CSF leak, systemic lupus erythematosus, antiphospholipid syndrome, thyrotoxicosis, polycythaemia rubra vera, transmissible spongiform encephalopathies, coeliac disease and gluten ataxia.

== Treatment ==
There is no standard course of treatment for chorea. Treatment depends on the type of chorea and the associated disease. Although there are many drugs that can control it, no cure has yet been identified.

Form	Treatment
Huntington's-related	A common treatment is dopaminergic antagonists, although treatment is largely supportive. Tetrabenazine, deutetrabenazine and valbenazine are FDA-approved drugs for the treatment of Huntington's disease-related chorea.
Sydenham's chorea	Haloperidol, carbamazepine and valproic acid. Usually involves antibiotic drugs to treat the infection, followed by drug therapy to prevent recurrence.
Chorea gravidarum	haloperidol, chlorpromazine alone or in combination with diazepam, also pimozide can also be used.
Wilson's disease	Reducing levels of copper in the body using D-penicillamine, trientine hydrochloride, tetrathiomolybdate, and other chelating agents
Drug-induced chorea	Adjusting medication dosages.
Metabolic and endocrine-related choreas	Treated according to their causes.

== History ==
Historically, choreas like Huntington disease and Sydenham's chorea were called Saint Vitus' dance, related to a series of social phenomena of the same name.

== See also ==
- Choreoathetosis
- Dancing mania
- Stimming
- Tic
