= Himalayan rabbit =

Breed of rabbit

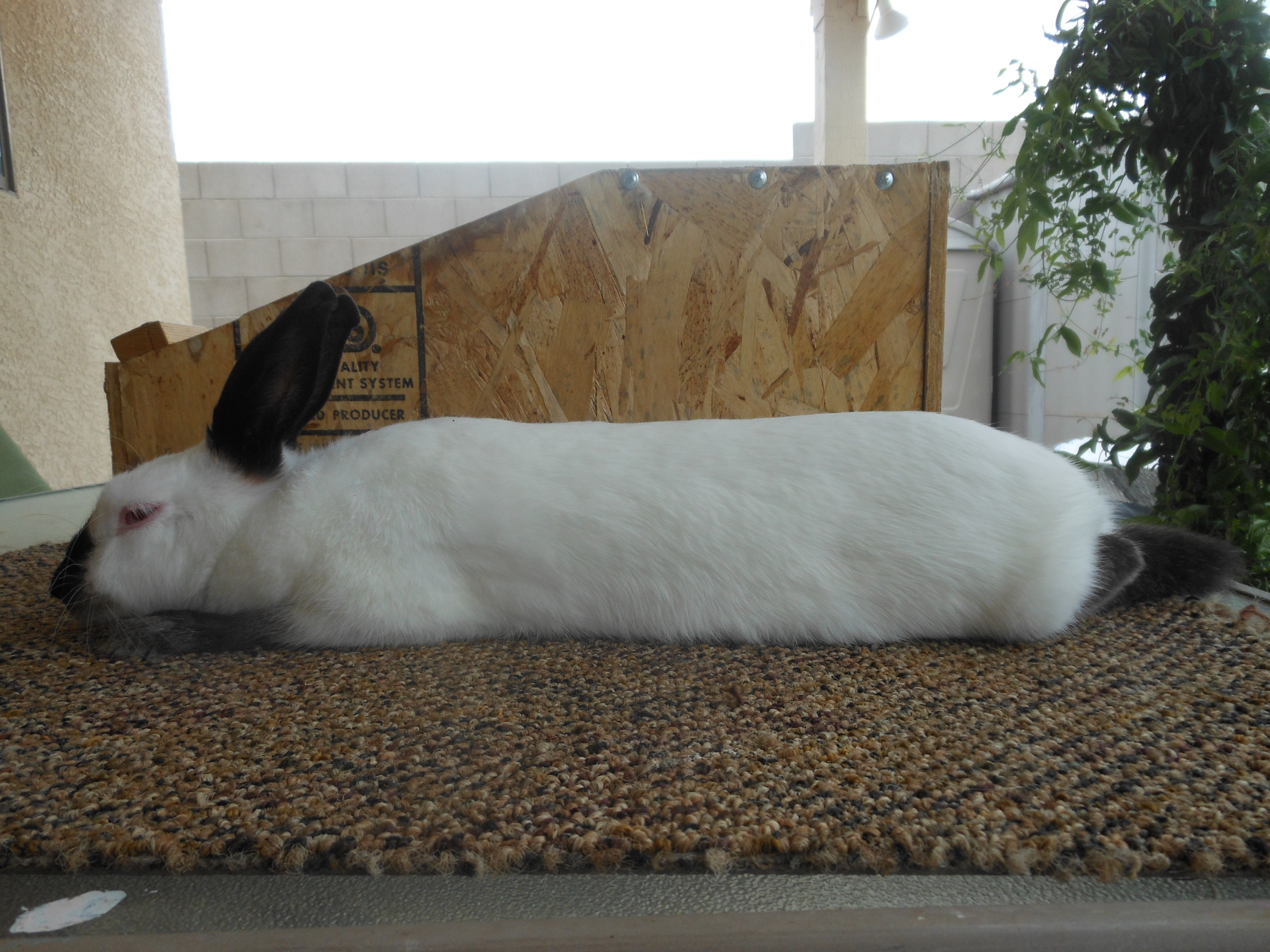
Himalayan rabbit in show pose

The Himalayan rabbit is a small breed of rabbit with similar markings to the Californian rabbit. The body is white with colored points, recognized colors are black, blue, chocolate, and lilac.

They are one of the oldest and calmest breeds. Adult Himalayans weigh 2.5 to 4.5 pounds (1.1 to 2.0 kg), with an ideal weight of 3.5 lb (1.6 kg). They are the only 'cylindrical' (shown posed in a stretched-out manner) rabbit breed. The history of the breed is partially a mystery, as there are no definite records that clearly state where the breed may have originated. Some speculate that their origin may be in the Far East as opposed to the Himalayas, as their name suggests.

When Himalayans are raised in cold climates, they can exhibit black coloration of their coats, making them a phenocopy of the black rabbit.

Himalayans are also known as the Chinese, Egyptian, and Black-nose. They are posed stretched out, and their body is to be 3.5 head lengths. They have fine bone and a skinny body, and, unlike many other breeds, were never raised primarily for meat. The breed's main purpose is for show, but in its past, it was raised for its white pelt. Also, they are the only rabbit breed that commonly has an extra set of nipples. They are the ancestors of Californians, one of the most common meat rabbits.

== History ==
Himalayan rabbits were one of the first breeds of rabbits, dating back thousands of years and although their origin is unknown they have been traced to Asia and the Middle East. It is unlikely, however, that they came from the Himalayan mountain region as their name suggests.

While it may be an old breed, Himalayans are relatively new in showing circles. "A description of the Himalayan rabbit was first published in 1857 in Europe and that by the end of the 19th century Himalayans were being raised for show in Great Britain". The Himalayan was finally introduced to the United States during the Belgian hare boom that began in 1898, during which the popularity of domestic rabbits increased dramatically. By the time the boom ended in 1901, Himalayan rabbits had begun to pop up at rabbit shows around the country. The pelt, which greatly resembles that of ermine, was quickly popular with rabbit breeders who would harvest the valuable fur to sell. Himalayan rabbits were often made into fur coats, sometimes masquerading as authentic ermine.

The original variety was the black Himalayan, and the blue Himalayan was created later. The chocolate and lilac varieties were made by different crosses depending on where they originated. American chocolate Himalayans were bred by Ron Smelt of California by mixing chocolate English spots to Himalayans. The lilacs were made by mixing the chocolate Himalayans the blues, but to create a color unique enough to get recognized as its own color (many early lilacs looked like light blues) lilac mini rexes were mixed in (these lines were mostly destroyed after the color was accepted).

The Himalayan plays an important part in many other breed's histories, especially the Californian rabbits, which looks like a commercial type rabbit with Himalayan markings. The Californian was made by crossing Himalayans with New Zealand's and a few other breeds (some Californian breeders say it is just Himalayan and New Zealand, while others say the Standard Chinchilla was mixed in as well). The Californian was added to many other breeds (like Champagne d'Argents and some lines of Cinnamon) to improve body type, so Himalayan marked sports pop up sometimes.

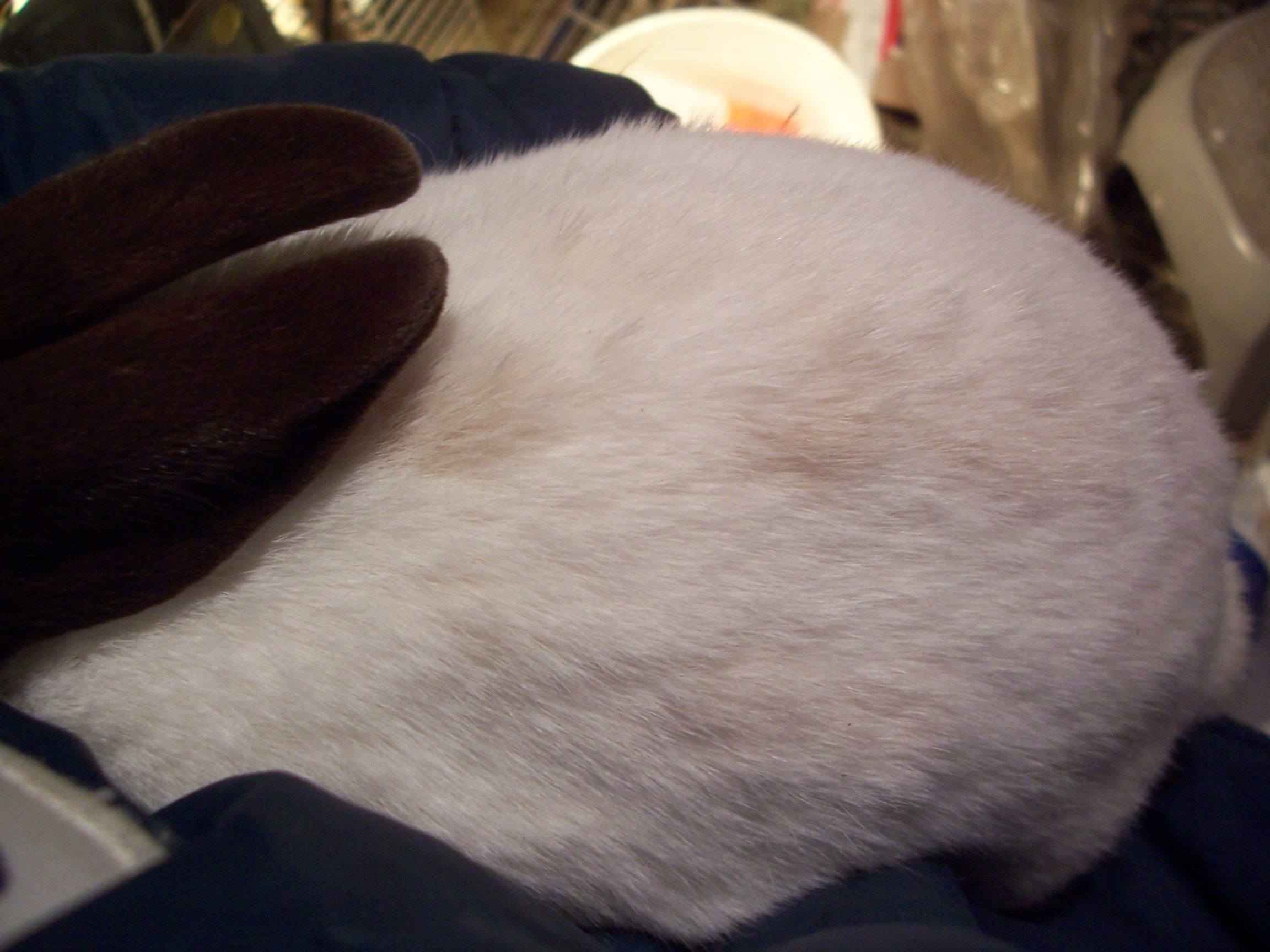
When Himalayans become chilled (usually under 45 °F (7 °C)) their coats will begin to turn various shades of tan, brown, blue, and black. These spots are called "Smut" and occur when a temperature-controlled protein in the fur is subject to cold temperatures (and often moisture).

== Markings ==
The Himalayan rabbit is well known for its markings, which are similar to the Himalayan cats'. They have dark ear, front feet (socks), hind feet (boots), a dark Scut, and a dark spot on nose. The markings change with age and environment. Cold weather may darken markings, enlarge markings, and also add markings (called Smut) around the eyes, genitals (vent smut), or other white parts of the body. Eye and genital markings are not a disqualification because Smut is not on the usable portion of the pelt. If the Smut spreads onto the usable portion of the pelt, such as the belly or on the pin bones, it is a disqualification. Warmer weather may lighten markings, shrink markings, and cause white hairs in markings (known as "frosting"). In extremely warm weather, a Himalayan may even develop light or white toenails. For toenails to noticeably change, the rabbit would be greatly suffering due to the high heat intolerance of the breed.

Chocolate and lilac Himalayans often have bigger markings than blacks and blues and are usually more likely to develop disqualifying markings, known as "smut" – although if the line has mixed variety lineage there will be great fluctuation within the specimens. Himalayans may develop smut after just ten minutes of contact with cold objects. Travel cages must always be stored in a warm place such as a house or attached shed that stays at 60 °F (16 °C) or higher, otherwise, cages and carriers will need to be warmed before use.

Himalayan kits are especially sensitive to temperature. Most babies in the warmth of the nest will look the same as albino babies. The reason for this is that Himalayans can only produce eumelanin under a certain temperature and they cannot produce pheomelanin at all. Kits will get their markings at the age they become more independent from their mother and littermates. If a nest gets too cold or a baby falls out, they will get dark bands on their fur. This varies from looking to off-white to looking chinchilla-colored, and it causes confusion among many novice breeders. Because of their constantly changing colors, most Himalayan breeders do not look at markings as a factor when making breeding plans. A baby who was chilled in the nest box is often called "frosty," which is not to be confused with frosted pearl. Experienced breeders may take young kits out of the nest box, keeping them at about 70 or 75 °F (21 or 24 °C), until they become frosty so that once the kit matures and sheds the frosty coat, their markings will be much darker and shinier.

Himalayans will always have pink irises, these are not to be confused with red eyes, because while both can be present in rabbits, a pure Himalayan will not have traditionally red eyes. Himalayan marked rabbits without pink eyes are usually misidentified sable points or of mixed heritage.

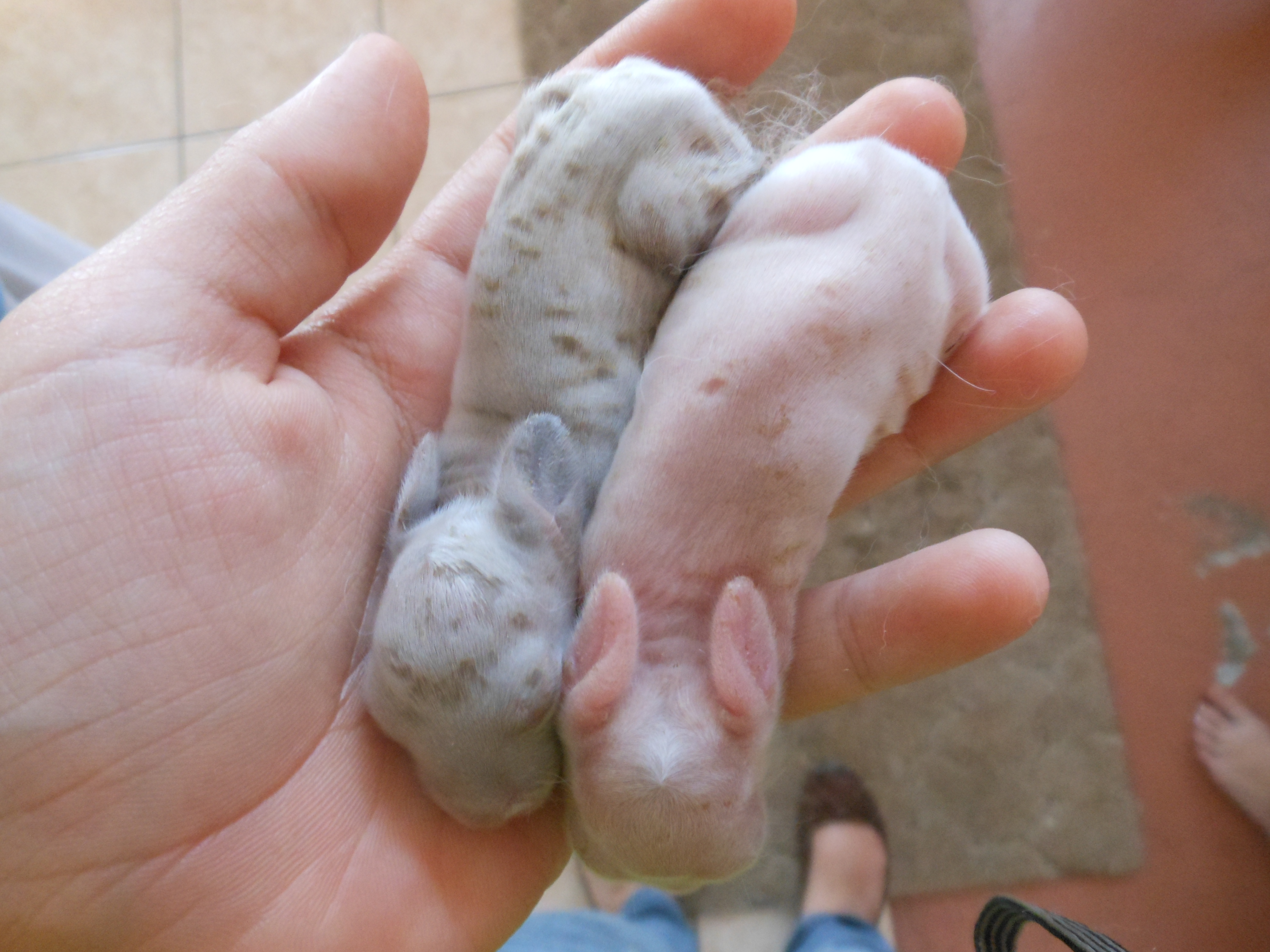
The rabbit on the left fell out of the nest and was at about 70 °F (21 °C). The one on the right was in its nest at about 95 °F (35 °C).

== Genetics ==
Himalayan rabbits are known for having a double copy of the "ch" gene and a mutated albinism gene which causes the differences in eumelanin and pheomelanin production. The mutation is what creates the specific markings.

Himalayan rabbits have four phenotypes: Black, Blue, Chocolate and Lilac.

Black is the original and most dominant color, represented by a "B", Chocolate is a color mutation and is represented as a "b" and Black will always be dominant over Chocolate. These two colors are known as full saturation.

The dilute gene was introduced into the breed through outcrossing with other rabbit breeds to add Blue and Lilac rabbits. The dilute gene can occur naturally in Himalayans when the dilute gene mutates in black Himalayans and produces a blue, however, most blue Himalayans now have Netherland dwarf or mini rex influence as a result of breeding for dilutes. Dilute is recessive so you will have fewer dilute kittens in a litter produced by parents. Black is the most common because it is the most dominant, Chocolate and blue are the next common because they both carry a dominant and a recessive trait, Lilac is the rarest as the result of production by two recessive traits. If breeding specifically for color, it is possible to fine-tune offspring colors by breeding within specific lines.

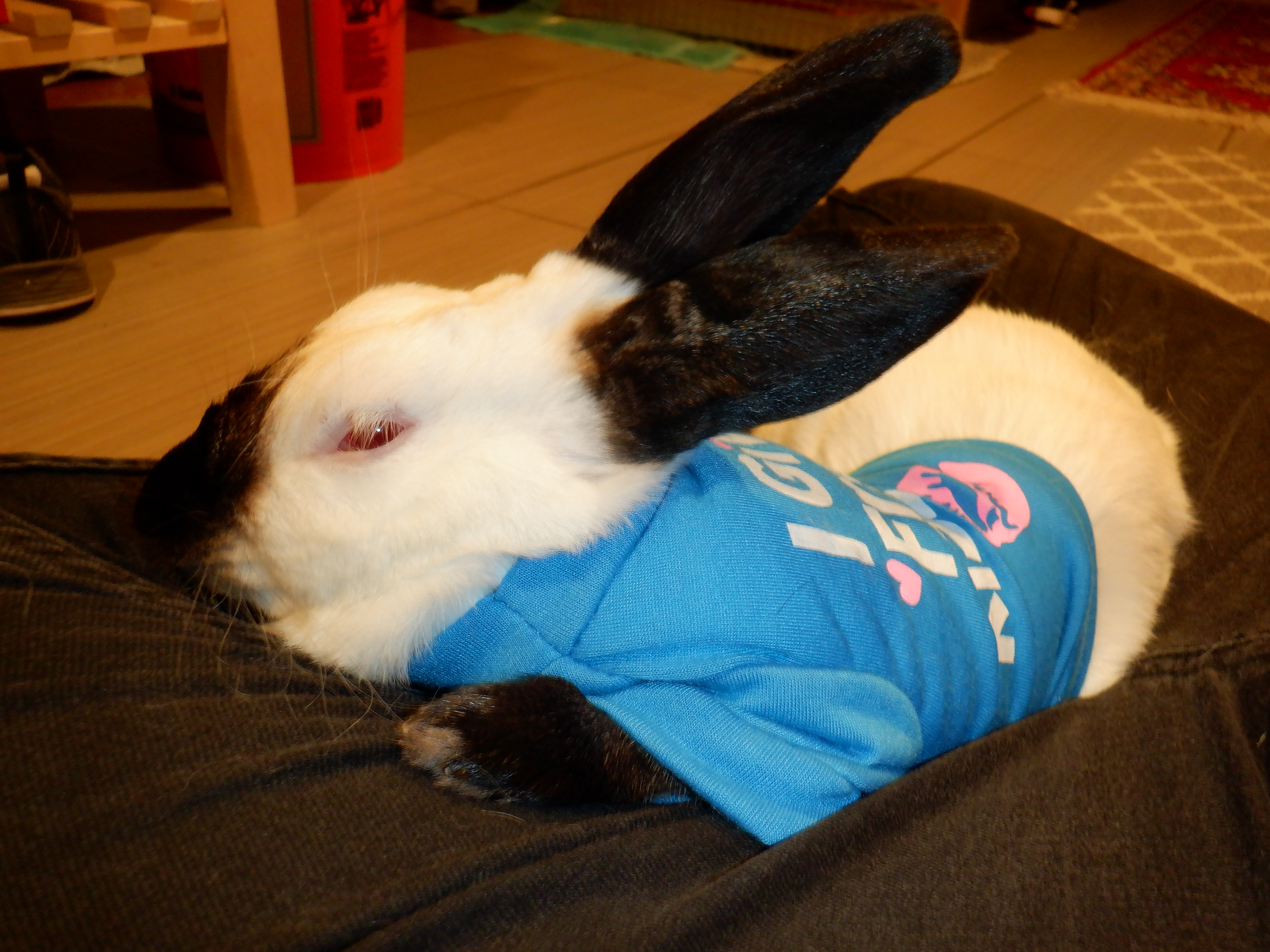
Himalayan rabbits are well known for their temperament and are popular with youth for showing.

The Himalayan gene ("ch") has been bred into many other breeds, but those breeds lack marking modifiers which tends to create smaller, lighter markings.

== Unique qualities ==
- Himalayans are the only breed posed stretched out (cylindrical)
- Himalayan rabbits are a common youth breed and are well known for their good temperament.
- European Himalayans and American Himalayans have different poses.
- Himalayans commonly have an extra set of teats.
- Himalayans are one of four breeds that can be moved up to senior class regardless of their weight.
- Himalayan rabbits are very good mothers and are used often used to foster kits from other rabbits.
- The breed slogan "BEAUTY OF THE AGES" ties into the long and illustrious nature of the Himalayan's history.

== See also ==
- List of rabbit breeds
