= AB-1001 =

Experimental gene therapy

AB-1001 is an experimental gene therapy developed for Huntington's disease. It is intended to increase the production of the CYP46A1 enzyme and cholesterol levels in the brain.
