= Huntington's disease =

Inherited neurodegenerative disorder

- Other names: Huntington's chorea
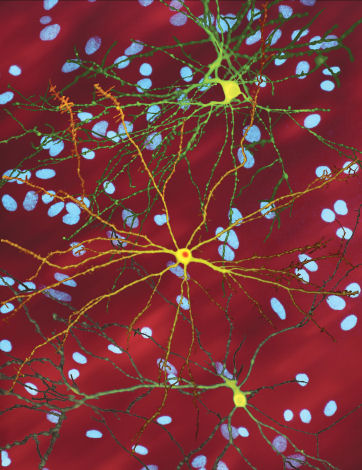
- An edited microscopic image of a medium spiny neuron (yellow) with an inclusion body (orange), which occurs as part of the disease process (image width 360 μm)
- Specialty: Neurology, Medical Genetics
- Symptoms: Problems with motor skills including coordination and gait, mood, and mental abilities
- Complications: Pneumonia, heart disease, physical injury from falls, suicide
- Usual onset: 30–50 years old
- Duration: Long term
- Causes: Genetic (inherited or new mutation)
- Diagnostic method: Genetic testing
- Differential diagnosis: Sydenham's chorea, benign hereditary chorea, lupus, paraneoplastic syndrome, Wilson's disease
- Treatment: Supportive care
- Medication: Tetrabenazine
- Prognosis: Invariably fatal, 15–20 years from onset of symptoms
- Frequency: 4–15 in 100,000 (European descent)
- Named after: George Huntington

Huntington's or Huntington disease (HD), also known as Huntington's chorea, is a fatal neurodegenerative disease that is usually inherited. It typically presents as a triad of progressive psychiatric, cognitive, and motor symptoms. The earliest symptoms are often subtle problems with mood or mental/psychiatric abilities, which precede the motor symptoms for many people. The definitive physical symptoms, including a general lack of coordination and an unsteady gait, eventually follow. Over time, the basal ganglia region of the brain gradually becomes damaged.

The disease is primarily characterized by a distinctive hyperkinetic movement disorder known as chorea. Chorea classically presents as uncoordinated, involuntary, "dance-like" body movements that become more apparent as the disease advances. Physical abilities gradually worsen until coordinated movement becomes difficult and the person is unable to talk. Mental abilities generally decline into dementia, depression, apathy, and impulsivity at times. The specific symptoms vary somewhat among cases. Symptoms can start at any age, but are usually first seen around the age of 40. The disease may develop earlier in each successive generation. About eight percent of cases start before the age of 20 years, and are known as juvenile HD, which typically present with the slow movement symptoms of Parkinson's disease rather than those of chorea.

HD is typically inherited from an affected parent, who carries a mutation in the huntingtin gene (HTT), which encodes the huntingtin protein. However, up to 10% of cases are due to a new mutation. Expansion of CAG repeats (known as a trinucleotide repeat expansion) in the gene coding for the huntingtin protein results in an abnormal mutant protein (mHTT), which gradually damages brain cells through a number of possible mechanisms. The mutant protein is dominant, so having one parent who is a carrier of the trait is sufficient to trigger the disease in their children. Diagnosis is by genetic testing, which can be carried out at any time, regardless of whether or not symptoms are present. This fact raises several ethical debates: the age at which an individual is considered mature enough to choose testing; whether parents have the right to have their children tested; and managing confidentiality and disclosure of test results.

No cure for HD is known, and full-time care is required in the later stages. Treatments can relieve some symptoms and possibly improve quality of life. The best evidence for treatment of the movement problems is with tetrabenazine. HD affects about 4 to 15 in 100,000 people of European descent. It is rare among the Finnish and the Japanese, while the incidence in Africa is unknown. The disease affects males and females equally. Complications such as pneumonia, heart disease, and physical injury from falls reduce life expectancy; fatal aspiration pneumonia is commonly cited as the ultimate cause of death for those with the condition. Suicide is the cause of death in about 9% of cases. Death typically occurs 15–20 years from when the disease was first detected.

The earliest known description of the disease was in 1841 by the American physician Charles Oscar Waters. The condition was described in further detail in 1872 by the American physician George Huntington. The genetic basis was discovered in 1993 by an international collaborative effort led by the Hereditary Disease Foundation. Research and support organizations began forming in the late 1960s to increase public awareness, provide support for the afflicted and their families, and promote research. Research directions include determining the exact mechanism of the disease, improving animal models to aid with research, testing of medications and their delivery to treat symptoms or slow the progression of the disease, and studying procedures such as stem-cell therapy with the goal of replacing damaged or lost neurons.

== Signs and symptoms ==
Signs and symptoms of Huntington's disease most commonly become noticeable between the ages of 30 and 50 years, but they can begin at any age and present as a triad of motor, cognitive, and psychiatric symptoms. When developed in an early stage, it is known as juvenile Huntington's disease. In 50% of cases, the psychiatric symptoms appear first. These can precede the motor symptoms by many years. Disease progression is often described in early stages, middle stages and late stages with an earlier prodromal phase. In the early stages, subtle personality changes, problems in cognition and physical skills, irritability and mood swings occur, all of which may go unnoticed. Almost everyone with HD eventually exhibits similar physical symptoms, but the onset, progression, and extent of cognitive and behavioral symptoms vary significantly between individuals.

The most characteristic initial physical symptoms are jerky, random and uncontrollable movements called chorea. Many people are not aware of their involuntary movements, nor are they impeded by them. Chorea may be initially exhibited as general restlessness, small unintentionally initiated or uncompleted motions, lack of coordination, or slowed saccadic eye movements. These minor motor abnormalities usually precede more obvious signs of motor dysfunction by at least three years. The clear appearance of symptoms such as rigidity, writhing motions, or abnormal posturing appear as the disorder progresses. These are signs that the system in the brain that is responsible for movement has been affected. Psychomotor functions become increasingly impaired, such that any action that requires muscle control is affected. When muscle control is affected, such as with rigidity or muscle contractures, it is known as dystonia. Dystonia is a neurological hyperkinetic movement disorder that results in twisting or repetitive movements that may resemble a tremor. Common consequences are physical instability, abnormal facial expression, and difficulties chewing, swallowing and speaking. Sleep disturbances and weight loss are also associated symptoms, and difficulty eating may cause weight loss and malnutrition. Juvenile HD generally progresses at a faster rate with greater cognitive decline, and chorea is exhibited briefly, if at all. The Westphal variant of slowness of movement, rigidity, and tremors is more typical in juvenile HD, as are seizures.

Cognitive abilities are progressively impaired and tend to generally decline into dementia. Especially affected are executive functions, which include planning, cognitive flexibility, abstract thinking, rule acquisition, initiation of appropriate actions, and inhibition of inappropriate actions. Different cognitive impairments include difficulty focusing on tasks, lack of flexibility, a lack of impulse, a lack of awareness of one's own behaviors and abilities and difficulty learning or processing new information. As the disease progresses, memory deficits tend to appear. Reported impairments range from short-term memory deficits to long-term memory difficulties, including deficits in episodic (memory of one's life), procedural (memory of the body of how to perform an activity), and working memory.

Reported neuropsychiatric signs are anxiety, depression, a reduced display of emotions, egocentrism, aggression, and compulsive behavior and hallucination and delusion. Other common psychiatric disorders could include obsessive–compulsive disorder, mania, insomnia and bipolar disorder. Difficulties in recognizing other people's negative expressions have also been observed. The prevalence of these symptoms is highly variable between studies, with estimated rates for lifetime prevalence of psychiatric disorders between 33 and 76%. For many with the disease and their families, these symptoms are among the most distressing aspects of the disease, often affecting daily functioning and constituting reason for institutionalization. Early behavioral changes in HD result in an increased risk of suicide. Often, individuals have reduced awareness of chorea, cognitive, and emotional impairments.

== Genetics ==
Huntington's disease is a trinucleotide repeat disorder caused by trinucleotide repeat expansion in the first exon of the huntingtin gene (HTT), which encodes the huntingtin protein (HTT). HTT may also be referred to as the HD gene or, historically, IT15 (interesting transcript 15). It is located on the short arm of chromosome 4 at 4p16.3. The trinucleotide repeat region of HTT is primarily composed of CAG, which encodes the amino acid glutamine; thus, the resulting protein contains a polyglutamine tract (polyQ tract). The number of repeats varies in length between individuals and may change length between generations. When the length of this repeated section exceeds a certain threshold, it produces mutant huntingtin protein (mHTT). In turn, mHTT has toxic gains and losses of function which negatively impact cell function and lead to disease. The Huntington's disease mutation is genetically dominant and almost fully penetrant; a single mutant HTT allele from either parent is sufficient to cause the disease. Because the rate of mutation is higher in sperm cells, males are more likely to transmit expanded HTT alleles to their offspring.

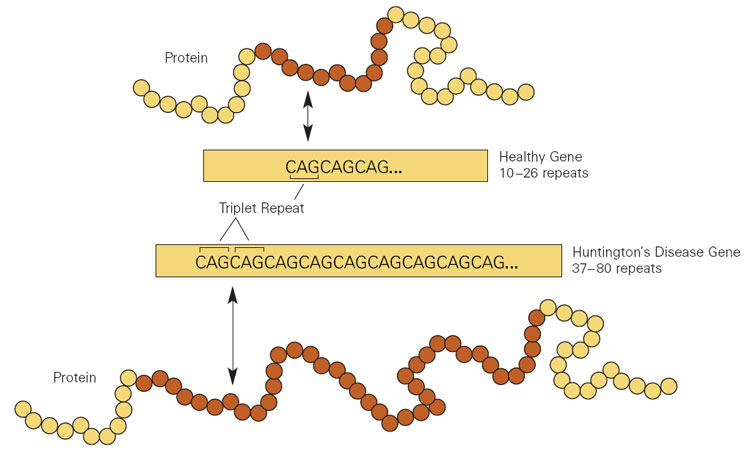
(Top) Typical CAG repeat number in the HTT gene and resulting normal HTT protein, compared to (bottom) disease-causing number of CAG repeats leading to an expanded polyglutamine tract in the mutant HTT protein

Classification of trinucleotide repeats, and resulting disease status, depending on the number of CAG repeats
Repeat count	Classification	Disease status	Risk to offspring
<27	Normal	Will not be affected	None
27–35	Intermediate	Will not be affected	Elevated, but <50%
36–39	Reduced Penetrance	May or may not be affected	50%
40+	Full penetrance	Will be affected	50%

Typically, people have fewer than 36 repeats in the polyQ region, which results in the normal production and cytoplasmic localization of the huntingtin. However, 36 or more repeats result in the production of a mutant huntingtin (mHTT), which causes degeneration of medium spiny neurons. Regions of the brain have differing amounts and reliance on these types of neurons and are affected accordingly. Generally, the number of CAG repeats is related to how much this process is affected, and accounts for about 60% of the variation of the age of the onset of symptoms. The remaining variation is attributed to the environment and other genes that modify the mechanism of HD. About 36 to 39 repeats result in a reduced-penetrance form of the disease, with a much later onset and slower progression of symptoms. In some cases, the onset may be so late that symptoms are never noticed. With very large repeat counts (more than 60), HD onset can occur below the age of 20, known as juvenile HD. Juvenile HD is typically of the Westphal variant that is characterized by slowness of movement, rigidity, and tremors. This accounts for about 7% of HD carriers.

=== Inheritance ===
Huntington's disease is inherited in an autosomal dominant fashion. The probability of each offspring inheriting an affected gene is 50%. Inheritance is independent of sex, and the phenotype does not skip generations.

Huntington's disease has autosomal dominant inheritance, meaning that an affected individual typically inherits one copy of the gene with an expanded trinucleotide repeat (the mutant allele) from an affected parent. Since the penetrance of the mutation is very high, those who have a mutated copy of the gene will have the disease. In this type of inheritance pattern, each offspring of an affected individual has a 50% risk of inheriting the mutant allele and developing the disease (see figure). This probability is sex-independent since the huntingtin gene is not located on the X or Y chromosomes.

Trinucleotide CAG repeats numbering over 28 are unstable during replication, and this instability increases with the number of repeats present. This usually leads to new expansions as generations pass (dynamic mutations) instead of reproducing an exact copy of the trinucleotide repeat. This causes the number of repeats to change in successive generations, such that an unaffected parent with an "intermediate" number of repeats (28–35), or "reduced penetrance" (36–40), may pass on a copy of the gene with an increase in the number of repeats that produces fully penetrant HD. The earlier age of onset and greater severity of disease in successive generations due to increases in the number of repeats is known as genetic anticipation. Instability is greater in spermatogenesis than oogenesis; maternally inherited alleles are usually of a similar repeat length, whereas paternally inherited ones have a higher chance of increasing in length. Rarely is Huntington's disease caused by a new mutation, where neither parent has over 36 CAG repeats.

In the rare situations where both parents have an expanded HD gene, the risk increases to 75%, and when either parent has two expanded copies, the risk is 100%. Individuals with both genes affected are rare. For some time, HD was thought to be the only disease for which possession of a second mutated gene did not affect symptoms and progression, but it has since been found that it can affect the phenotype and the rate of progression.

== Mechanisms ==
Huntingtin protein (HTT) interacts with over 100 other proteins, and appears to have multiple functions. The behavior of the mutated protein (mHTT) is not completely understood, but it is toxic to certain cell types, particularly brain cells. Early damage is most evident in the subcortical basal ganglia, initially in the striatum, but as the disease progresses, other areas of the brain are also affected, including regions of the cerebral cortex. Early symptoms are attributable to functions of the striatum and its cortical connections—namely control over movement, mood, and higher cognitive function. DNA methylation also appears to be changed in HD.

In 2025, scientists affiliated with Harvard and MIT published a study examining the mechanism behind the onset of symptoms. They found that the length of the repeated trinucleotide sequence increases with age due to accumulated errors in DNA mismatch repair processes after transcription, and that this becomes toxic once the sequence expands beyond 150 repeats.

Structure of aggregated huntingtin exon 1 (HTTex1), featuring a 44-residue polyglutamine domain, seen from different perspectives. Based on integrative modelling of lab-made aggregates.

=== Huntingtin function ===
HTT is expressed in all cells, with the highest concentrations found in the brain and testes, and moderate amounts in the liver, heart, and lungs. Although its full range of functions is not yet understood, HTT interacts with proteins involved in transcription, cell signaling, and intracellular transport. Studies in genetically modified animals have shown that wild-type HTT is essential for embryonic development, as complete absence of the gene results in embryonic death. HTT also plays a protective role in mature neurons: it regulates the production of brain-derived neurotrophic factor, supports synaptic vesicular transport and synaptic transmission, controls neuronal gene transcription, and prevents programmed cell death by inhibiting apoptotic enzymes such as caspases. In contrast to these protective roles, the mutant form of the protein (mHTT) interferes with the ubiquitin-proteasome system, which promotes caspase activation, contributing to neurodegeneration. Increasing the expression of HTT can promote brain cell survival and ameliorate the effects of mHTT, whereas reducing it can exacerbate those effects. Accordingly, the disease is thought not to be caused by inadequate expression of HTT, but by a toxic gain-of-function of mHTT in the body. The mutant protein is expressed throughout the body and associated with abnormalities in peripheral tissues outside of the brain, which can include muscle atrophy, cardiac failure, impaired glucose tolerance, weight loss, osteoporosis, and testicular atrophy.

=== Cellular changes ===
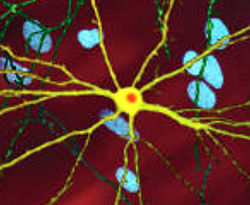
A microscope image of a neuron with an inclusion body (stained orange) caused by HD, image width 250 μm

The toxic action of mHTT may manifest and produce the HD pathology through multiple cellular changes. In its mutant (polyglutamine expanded) form, the protein is more prone to cleavage that creates shorter fragments containing the polyglutamine expansion. These protein fragments have a propensity to undergo misfolding and aggregation, yielding fibrillar aggregates in which non-native polyglutamine β-strands from multiple proteins are bonded together by hydrogen bonds. These aggregates share the same fundamental cross-beta amyloid architecture seen in other protein deposition diseases. The aggregates are covered on their surface with a 'fuzzy coat' that contains non-polyglutamine parts of the protein, as illustrated in a published structural model shown above. Over time, the aggregates accumulate to form inclusion bodies within cells, ultimately interfering with neuronal function. Inclusion bodies have been found in both the cell nucleus and cytoplasm. Inclusion bodies in cells of the brain are one of the earliest pathological changes, and some experiments have found that they can be toxic for the cell, but other experiments have shown that they may form as part of the body's defense mechanism and help protect cells.

Several pathways by which mHTT may cause cell death have been identified. These include effects on chaperone proteins, which help fold proteins and remove misfolded ones; interactions with caspases, which play a role in the process of removing cells; the toxic effects of glutamine on nerve cells; impairment of energy production within cells; and effects on the expression of genes.

Mutant huntingtin protein has been found to play a key role in mitochondrial dysfunction. The impairment of mitochondrial electron transport can result in higher levels of oxidative stress and release of reactive oxygen species.

Glutamine is known to be excitotoxic when present in large amounts, that can cause damage to numerous cellular structures. Excessive glutamine is not found in HD, but the interactions of the altered huntingtin protein with numerous proteins in neurons lead to an increased vulnerability to glutamine. The increased vulnerability is thought to result in excitotoxic effects from normal glutamine levels.

A somatic expansion of CAG repeats is involved in the progression of the disease. Over decades, the HTT gene first sees its CAG repeats expand to about 80 copies: the 35+ CAG locus causes additional slippage errors that expand the repeat. Then the process accelerates, reaching 150 copies within years. There is no significant toxic effect on the cell until 150 copies, at which point a large number of genes become progressively dysregulated. Over months, the medium spiny neuron slowly loses its cell identity until cell death pathways are activated.

=== Macroscopic changes ===
The area of the brain most damaged in early Huntington's disease is the dorsal striatum made up of the caudate nucleus and the putamen.

Initially, damage to the brain is regionally specific with the dorsal striatum in the subcortical basal ganglia being primarily affected, followed later by cortical involvement in all areas. Other areas of the basal ganglia affected include the substantia nigra; cortical involvement includes cortical layers 3, 5, and 6; also evident is involvement of the hippocampus, Purkinje cells in the cerebellum, lateral tuberal nuclei of the hypothalamus and parts of the thalamus. These areas are affected according to their structure and the types of neurons they contain, reducing in size as they lose cells. Striatal medium spiny neurons are the most vulnerable, particularly ones with projections towards the external globus pallidus, with interneurons and spiny cells projecting to the internal globus pallidus being less affected. HD also causes an abnormal increase in astrocytes and activation of the brain's immune cells, microglia.

The basal ganglia play a key role in movement and behavior control. Their functions are not fully understood, but theories propose that they are part of the cognitive executive system and the motor circuit. The basal ganglia ordinarily inhibit a large number of circuits that generate specific movements. To initiate a particular movement, the cerebral cortex sends a signal to the basal ganglia that causes the inhibition to be released. Damage to the basal ganglia can cause the release or reinstatement of the inhibitions to be erratic and uncontrolled, which results in an awkward start to the motion or motions to be unintentionally initiated or in a motion to be halted before or beyond its intended completion. The accumulating damage to this area causes the characteristic erratic movements associated with HD, known as chorea, a dyskinesia. Because of the basal ganglia's inability to inhibit movements, individuals affected by it inevitably experience a reduced ability to produce speech and swallow foods and liquids (dysphagia).

=== Transcriptional dysregulation ===
CREB-binding protein (CBP), a transcriptional coregulator, is essential for cell function because as a coactivator at a significant number of promoters, it activates the transcription of genes for survival pathways. CBP contains an acetyltransferase domain to which HTT binds through its polyglutamine-containing domain. Autopsied brains of those who had Huntington's disease also have been found to have incredibly reduced amounts of CBP. In addition, when CBP is overexpressed, polyglutamine-induced death is diminished, further demonstrating that CBP plays an important role in Huntington's disease and neurons in general.

== Diagnosis ==
Diagnosis of the onset of HD can be made following the appearance of physical symptoms specific to the disease. Genetic testing can be used to confirm a physical diagnosis if no family history of HD exists. Even before the onset of symptoms, genetic testing can confirm if an individual or embryo carries an expanded copy of the trinucleotide repeat (CAG) in the HTT gene that causes the disease. Genetic counseling is available to provide advice and guidance throughout the testing procedure and on the implications of a confirmed diagnosis. These implications include the impact on an individual's psychology, career, family-planning decisions, relatives, and relationships. As of 2007 one study showed that despite the availability of pre-symptomatic testing, only 5% of those at risk of inheriting HD choose to do so.

=== Clinical ===
Coronal section from an MRI brain scan of a patient with HD, showing atrophy of the heads of the caudate nuclei, enlargement of the frontal horns of the lateral ventricles (hydrocephalus ex vacuo), and generalized cortical atrophy

A physical examination, sometimes combined with a psychological examination, can determine whether the onset of the disease has begun. Excessive unintentional movements of any part of the body are often the reason for seeking medical consultation. If these are abrupt and have random timing and distribution, they suggest a diagnosis of HD. Cognitive or behavioral symptoms are rarely the first symptoms diagnosed; they are usually only recognized in hindsight or when they develop further. How far the disease has progressed can be measured using the unified Huntington's disease rating scale, which provides an overall rating system based on motor, behavioral, cognitive, and functional assessments. Medical imaging, such as a CT scan or MRI scan, can show atrophy of the caudate nuclei early in the disease, as seen in the illustration to the right, but these changes are not, by themselves, diagnostic of HD. Cerebral atrophy can be seen in the advanced stages of the disease. Functional neuroimaging techniques, such as functional magnetic resonance imaging (fMRI) and positron emission tomography (PET), can show changes in brain activity before the onset of physical symptoms, but they are experimental tools and are not used clinically.

=== Predictive genetic testing ===
Because HD follows an autosomal dominant pattern of inheritance, a strong motivation exists for individuals who are at risk of inheriting it to seek a diagnosis. The genetic test for HD consists of a blood test, which counts the numbers of CAG repeats in each of the HTT alleles. Cutoffs are given as follows:

- At 40 or more CAG repeats, full penetrance allele (FPA) exists. A "positive test" or "positive result" generally refers to this case. A positive result is not considered a diagnosis, since it may be obtained decades before the symptoms begin. However, a negative test means that the individual does not carry the expanded copy of the gene and will not develop HD. The test will tell a person who originally had a 50% chance of inheriting the disease if their risk goes up to 100% or is eliminated. Persons who test positive for the disease will develop HD sometime within their lifetimes, provided they live long enough for the symptoms to appear.
- At 36 to 39 repeats, incomplete or reduced penetrance allele (RPA) may cause symptoms, usually later in the adult life. The maximum risk is 60% that a person with an RPA will be symptomatic at age 65, and 70% at 75.
- At 27 to 35 repeats, intermediate allele (IA), or large normal allele, is not associated with symptomatic disease in the tested individual, but may expand upon further inheritance to give symptoms in offspring.
- With 26 or fewer repeats, the result is not associated with HD.

Testing before the onset of symptoms is a life-changing event and a very personal decision. The main reason given for choosing to test for HD is to aid in career and family decisions. Predictive testing for Huntington's disease has been available via linkage analysis (which requires testing multiple family members) since 1986 and via direct mutation analysis since 1993. At that time, surveys indicated that 50–70% of at-risk individuals would have been interested in receiving testing, but since predictive testing has been offered far fewer choose to be tested. Over 95% of individuals at risk of inheriting HD do not proceed with testing, mostly because it has no treatment. A key issue is the anxiety an individual experiences about not knowing whether they will eventually develop HD, compared to the impact of a positive result. Irrespective of the result, stress levels are lower two years after being tested, but the risk of suicide is increased after a positive test result. Individuals found to have not inherited the disorder may experience survivor guilt about family members who are affected. Other factors taken into account when considering testing include the possibility of discrimination and the implications of a positive result, which usually means a parent has an affected gene and that the individual's siblings will be at risk of inheriting it. In one study, genetic discrimination was found in 46% of individuals at risk for Huntington's disease. It occurred at higher rates within personal relationships than health insurance or employment relations. Genetic counseling in HD can provide information, advice and support for initial decision-making, and then, if chosen, throughout all stages of the testing process. Because of the implications of this test, patients who wish to undergo testing must complete three counseling sessions which provide information about Huntington's.

Counseling and guidelines on the use of genetic testing for HD have become models for other genetic disorders, such as autosomal dominant cerebellar ataxia. Presymptomatic testing for HD has also influenced testing for other illnesses with genetic variants such as polycystic kidney disease, familial Alzheimer's disease and breast cancer. The European Molecular Genetics Quality Network have published yearly external quality assessment scheme for molecular genetic testing for this disease and have developed best practice guidelines for genetic testing for HD to assist in testing and reporting of results.

=== Preimplantation genetic diagnosis ===
Embryos produced using in vitro fertilization may be genetically tested for HD using preimplantation genetic diagnosis. This technique, where one or two cells are extracted from a typically 4- to 8-cell embryo and then tested for the genetic abnormality, can then be used to ensure embryos affected with HD genes are not implanted, so any offspring will not inherit the disease. Some forms of preimplantation genetic diagnosis—non-disclosure or exclusion testing—allow at-risk people to have HD-free offspring without revealing their own parental genotype, giving no information about whether they themselves are destined to develop HD. In exclusion testing, the embryo's DNA is compared with that of the parents and grandparents to avoid inheritance of the chromosomal region containing the HD gene from the affected grandparent. In nondisclosure testing, only disease-free embryos are replaced in the uterus while the parental genotype and hence parental risk for HD are never disclosed.

=== Prenatal testing ===
Obtaining a prenatal diagnosis for an embryo or fetus in the womb is also possible, using fetal genetic material acquired through chorionic villus sampling. An amniocentesis can be performed if the pregnancy is further along, within 14–18 weeks. This procedure looks at the amniotic fluid surrounding the baby for indicators of the HD mutation. This, too, can be paired with exclusion testing to avoid disclosure of parental genotype. Prenatal testing can be done when parents have been diagnosed with HD, when they have had genetic testing showing the expansion of the HTT gene, or when they have a 50% chance of inheriting the disease. The parents can be counseled on their options, which include termination of pregnancy, and on the difficulties of a child with the identified gene.

In addition, in at-risk pregnancies due to an affected male partner, noninvasive prenatal diagnosis can be performed by analyzing cell-free fetal DNA in a blood sample taken from the mother (via venipuncture) between six and 12 weeks of pregnancy. It has no procedure-related risk of miscarriage.

=== Differential diagnosis ===
About 99% of HD diagnoses based on the typical symptoms and a family history of the disease are confirmed by genetic testing to have the expanded trinucleotide repeat that causes HD. Most of the remaining are called HD-like (HDL) syndromes. The cause of most HDL diseases is unknown, but those with known causes are due to mutations in the prion protein gene (HDL1), the junctophilin 3 gene (HDL2), a recessively inherited unknown gene (HDL3—only found in two families and poorly understood), and the gene encoding the TATA box-binding protein (SCA17, sometimes called HDL4). Other autosomal dominant diseases that can be misdiagnosed as HD are dentatorubral-pallidoluysian atrophy and neuroferritinopathy. Also, some autosomal recessive disorders resemble sporadic cases of HD. These include chorea acanthocytosis and pantothenate kinase-associated neurodegeneration. One X-linked disorder of this type is McLeod syndrome.

== Management ==
Illustration from a case report in 1977 of a person with Huntington's disease

Treatments are available to reduce the severity of some HD symptoms. For many of these treatments, evidence to confirm their effectiveness in treating symptoms of HD specifically are incomplete. As the disease progresses, the ability to care for oneself declines, and carefully managed multidisciplinary caregiving becomes increasingly necessary. Although relatively few studies of exercises and therapies have shown to be helpful to rehabilitate cognitive symptoms of HD, some evidence shows the usefulness of physical therapy, occupational therapy, and speech therapy.

=== Therapy ===
Weight loss and problems in eating due to dysphagia and other muscle discoordination are common, making nutrition management increasingly important as the disease advances. Thickening agents can be added to liquids, as thicker fluids are easier and safer to swallow. Reminding the affected person to eat slowly and to take smaller pieces of food into the mouth may also be of use to prevent choking. If eating becomes too hazardous or uncomfortable, the option of using a percutaneous endoscopic gastrostomy is available. This feeding tube, permanently attached through the abdomen into the stomach, reduces the risk of aspirating food and provides better nutritional management. Assessment and management by speech-language pathologists with experience in Huntington's disease is recommended.

People with Huntington's disease may see a physical therapist for noninvasive and nonmedication-based ways of managing the physical symptoms. Physical therapists may implement fall risk assessment and prevention, as well as strengthening, stretching, and cardiovascular exercises. Walking aids may be prescribed as appropriate. Physical therapists also prescribe breathing exercises and airway clearance techniques with the development of respiratory problems. Consensus guidelines on physiotherapy in Huntington's disease have been produced by the European HD Network. Goals of early rehabilitation interventions are prevention of loss of function. Participation in rehabilitation programs during the early to middle stage of the disease may be beneficial as it translates into long-term maintenance of motor and functional performance. Rehabilitation during the late stage aims to compensate for motor and functional losses. For long-term independent management, the therapist may develop home exercise programs for appropriate people.

Palliative care may also improve quality of life for people with HD by treating the symptoms and psychological stress of having a progressive degenerative disease.

=== Medications ===
Chemical structure of tetrabenazine, an approved compound for the management of chorea in HD

Tetrabenazine was approved in 2000 for treatment of chorea in Huntington's disease in the EU, and in 2008 in the US. Although other drugs had been used "off label", tetrabenazine was the first approved treatment for Huntington's disease in the US. The compound has been known since the 1950s. In 2017, deutetrabenazine, a heavier form of tetrabenazine medication for the treatment of chorea in HD, was approved by the FDA. This is marketed as Austedo. Valbenazine (Ingrezza) was also approved by the FDA for the treatment of Huntington's disease chorea in 2023. Tetrabenazine, deutetrabenazine, and valbenazine are all vesicular monoamine transporter 2 (VMAT2) inhibitors, which work by depleting dopamine in the brain, lessening involuntary movements. These are the only drugs that have been approved specifically for Huntington's disease (namely the chorea associated with it).

Other drugs that help to reduce chorea include antipsychotics and benzodiazepines. Hypokinesia and rigidity, especially in juvenile cases, can be treated with antiparkinsonian drugs, and myoclonic hyperkinesia can be treated with valproic acid. Tentative evidence has found ethyl eicosapentaenoic acid to improve motor symptoms at one year. Amantadine has also been used to treat chorea, but there is limited evidence for its safety and efficacy.

Psychiatric symptoms can be treated with medications similar to those used in the general population. Selective serotonin reuptake inhibitors and mirtazapine have been recommended for depression, while atypical antipsychotics are recommended for psychosis and behavioral problems. Specialist neuropsychiatric input is recommended since people may require long-term treatment with multiple medications in combination.

=== Plant-based medications ===
There has been a number of alternative therapies experimented in ayurvedic medicine with plant-based products, although none have provided good evidence of efficacy. A recent study showed that the stromal processing peptidase (SPP), a synthetic enzyme found in plant chloroplasts, prevented the aggregation of proteins associated with Huntington's disease. However, repeat studies and clinical validation are needed to confirm its true therapeutic potential.

=== Education ===
The families of individuals, and society at large, who have inherited or are at risk of inheriting HD have generations of experience of HD but may be unaware of recent breakthroughs in understanding the disease, and of the availability of genetic testing. Genetic counseling benefits these individuals by updating their knowledge, seeking to dispel any unfounded beliefs that they may have, and helping them consider their future options and plans. The Patient Education Program for Huntington's Disease has been created to help educate family members, caretakers, and those diagnosed with Huntington's disease. Also covered is information concerning family planning choices, care management, and other considerations.

== Prognosis ==
The length of the trinucleotide repeat accounts for 60% of the variation of the age of symptoms onset and their rate of progress. A longer repeat results in an earlier age of onset and a faster progression of symptoms. Individuals with more than sixty repeats often develop the disease before age 20, while those with fewer than 40 repeats may remain asymptomatic. The remaining variation is due to environmental factors and other genes that influence the mechanism of the disease.

Life expectancy in HD is generally around 15 to 20 years following the onset of visible symptoms. Juvenile Huntington's disease has a life expectancy rate of 10 years after onset of visible symptoms. People with Huntington's disease usually have a reduced lifespan of around 58–63 years (mean), although it varies considerably, and different studies give slightly different ages. Most life-threatening complications result from muscle coordination, and to a lesser extent, behavioral changes induced by declining cognitive function. The largest risk is pneumonia, which causes death in one third of those with HD. As the ability to synchronize movements deteriorates, difficulty clearing the lungs, and an increased risk of aspirating food or drink both increase the risk of contracting pneumonia. The second-greatest risk is heart disease, which causes almost a quarter of fatalities of those with HD. Suicide is the third greatest cause of fatalities, with 7.3% of those with HD taking their own lives and up to 27% attempting to do so. To what extent suicidal thoughts are influenced by behavioral symptoms is unclear, as they signify a desire to avoid the later stages of the disease. Suicide is the greatest risk of this disease before the diagnosis is made and in the middle stages of development throughout the disease. Other associated risks include choking due to the inability to swallow, physical injury from falls, and malnutrition.

== Epidemiology ==
The late onset of Huntington's disease means it does not usually affect reproduction. The worldwide prevalence of HD is 5–10 cases per 100,000 persons, but varies greatly geographically as a result of ethnicity, local migration and past immigration patterns. Prevalence is similar for men and women. The rate of occurrence is highest in peoples of Western European descent, averaging around seven per 100,000 people, and is lower in the rest of the world; e.g., one per million people of Asian and African descent. A 2013 epidemiological study of the prevalence of HD in the UK between 1990 and 2010 found that the average prevalence for the UK was 12.3 per 100,000. Additionally, some localized areas have a much higher prevalence than their regional average. One of the highest incidences is in the isolated populations of the Lake Maracaibo region of Venezuela, where HD affects up to 700 per 100,000 persons. Other areas of high localization have been found in Tasmania and specific regions of Scotland, Wales and Sweden. Increased prevalence in some cases occurs due to a local founder effect, a historical migration of carriers into an area of geographic isolation. Some of these carriers have been traced back hundreds of years using genealogical studies. Genetic haplotypes can also give clues for the geographic variations of prevalence. Iceland, on the contrary, has a rather low prevalence of 1 per 100,000, despite the fact that Icelanders as a people are descended from the early Germanic tribes of Scandinavia which also gave rise to the Swedes; all cases with the exception of one going back nearly two centuries having derived from the offspring of a couple living early in the 19th century. Finland, as well, has a low incidence of only 2.2 per 100,000 people.

Until the discovery of a genetic test, statistics could only include clinical diagnosis based on physical symptoms and a family history of HD, excluding those who died of other causes before diagnosis. These cases can now be included in statistics; and, as the test becomes more widely available, estimates of the prevalence and incidence of the disorder are likely to increase.

== History ==
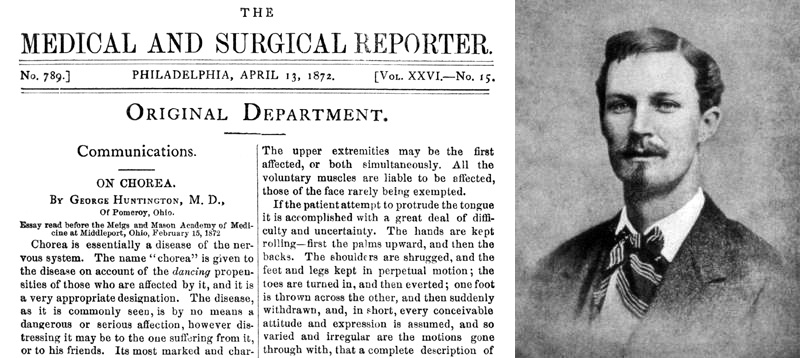
In 1872, George Huntington described the disorder in his first paper, "On Chorea", at the age of 22.

In centuries past, various kinds of chorea were at times called by names such as Saint Vitus' dance, with little or no understanding of their cause or type in each case.

The first definite mention of HD was in a letter by Charles Oscar Waters (1816–1892), published in the first edition of Robley Dunglison's Practice of Medicine in 1842. Waters described "a form of chorea, vulgarly called magrums", including accurate descriptions of the chorea, its progression, and the strong heredity of the disease. In 1846 Charles Rollin Gorman (1817–1879) observed how higher prevalence seemed to occur in localized regions. Independently of Gorman and Waters, both students of Dunglison at Jefferson Medical College in Philadelphia, Johan Christian Lund (1830–1906) also produced an early description in 1860. He specifically noted that in Setesdalen, a secluded mountain valley in Norway, the high prevalence of dementia was associated with a pattern of jerking movement disorders that ran in families.

The first thorough description of the disease was by George Huntington in 1872. Examining the combined medical history of several generations of a family exhibiting similar symptoms, he realized their conditions must be linked; he presented his detailed and accurate definition of the disease as his first paper. Huntington described the exact pattern of inheritance of autosomal dominant disease years before the rediscovery by scientists of Mendelian inheritance.

Of its hereditary nature. When either or both the parents have shown manifestations of the disease ... one or more of the offspring almost invariably suffer from the disease ... But if by any chance these children go through life without it, the thread is broken and the grandchildren and great-grandchildren of the original shakers may rest assured that they are free from the disease.

Sir William Osler was interested in the disorder and chorea in general, and was impressed with Huntington's paper, stating, "In the history of medicine, there are few instances in which a disease has been more accurately, more graphically or more briefly described." Osler's continued interest in HD, combined with his influence in the field of medicine, helped to rapidly spread awareness and knowledge of the disorder throughout the medical community. Great interest was shown by scientists in Europe, including Louis Théophile Joseph Landouzy, Désiré-Magloire Bourneville, Camillo Golgi, and Joseph Jules Dejerine, and until the end of the century, much of the research into HD was European in origin. By the end of the 19th century, research and reports on HD had been published in many countries and the disease was recognized as a worldwide condition.

During the rediscovery of Mendelian inheritance at the turn of the 20th century, HD was used tentatively as an example of autosomal dominant inheritance. English biologist William Bateson used the pedigrees of affected families to establish that HD had an autosomal dominant inheritance pattern. The strong inheritance pattern prompted several researchers, including Smith Ely Jelliffe, to attempt to trace and connect family members of previous studies. Jelliffe collected information from across New York and published several articles regarding the genealogy of HD in New England. Jelliffe's research roused the interest of his college friend, Charles Davenport, who commissioned Elizabeth Muncey to produce the first field study on the East Coast of the United States of families with HD and to construct their pedigrees. Davenport used this information to document the variable age of onset and range of symptoms of HD; he claimed that most cases of HD in the US could be traced back to a handful of individuals. This research was further embellished in 1932 by P. R. Vessie, who popularized the idea that three brothers who left England in 1630 bound for Boston were the progenitors of HD in the US. The claim that the earliest progenitors had been established and eugenic bias of Muncey's, Davenport's, and Vessie's work contributed to misunderstandings and prejudice about HD. Muncey and Davenport also popularized the idea that in the past, some with HD may have been thought to be possessed by spirits or victims of witchcraft, and were sometimes shunned or exiled by society. This idea has not been proven through scientific research. Researchers have found contrary evidence; for instance, the community of the family studied by George Huntington openly accommodated those who exhibited symptoms of HD.

The search for the cause of this condition was enhanced considerably in 1968, when the Hereditary Disease Foundation (HDF) was created by Milton Wexler, a psychoanalyst based in Los Angeles, California, whose wife Leonore Sabin had been diagnosed earlier that year with Huntington's disease. Sabin's three brothers also had this disease.

The foundation was involved in the recruitment of more than 100 scientists in the US-Venezuela Huntington's Disease Collaborative Project, which over a 10-year period from 1979, worked to locate the genetic cause. This was achieved in 1983 when a causal gene was approximately located, and in 1993, the gene was precisely located at chromosome 4 (4p16.3). The study had focused on the populations of two isolated Venezuelan villages, Barranquitas and Lagunetas, where there was an unusually high prevalence of HD, and involved over 18,000 people, mostly from a single extended family, and resulted in making HD the first autosomal disease locus found using genetic linkage analysis. Among other innovations, the project developed DNA-marking methods which were an important step in making the Human Genome Project possible.

In the same time, key discoveries concerning the mechanisms of the disorder were being made, including the findings by Anita Harding's research group on the effects of the gene's length.

Modeling the disease in various types of animals, such as the transgenic mouse developed in 1996, enabled larger-scale experiments. As these animals have faster metabolisms and much shorter lifespans than humans results from experiments are received sooner, speeding research. The 1997 discovery that mHTT fragments misfold led to the discovery of the nuclear inclusions they cause. These advances have led to increasingly extensive research into the proteins involved with the disease, potential drug treatments, care methods, and the gene itself.

The networks of care and support that had developed in Venezuela and Colombia during the research projects there in the 1970s through 2000s were eventually eroded by various forces, such as the ongoing crisis in Venezuela and the death of a lead researcher in Colombia (Jorge Daza Barriga). Doctors are working toward rekindling these networks because the people who have contributed to the science of HD by participating in these studies deserve adequate follow-up care; societies elsewhere in the world who benefit from the scientific advances thus achieved owe at least that much to those who participated in the research.

The condition was formerly called Huntington's chorea. The term was superseded by Huntington's disease because not all patients develop chorea; furthermore, cognitive and behavioral problems constitute a significant portion of HD symptomatology.

== Society and culture ==
=== Ethics ===
Genetic testing for Huntington's disease has raised several ethical issues, which include defining how mature an individual should be before being considered eligible for testing, ensuring the confidentiality of results, and deciding whether companies should be allowed to use test results for decisions on employment, life insurance or other financial matters. There was controversy when Charles Davenport proposed in 1910 that compulsory sterilization and immigration control be used for people with certain diseases, including HD, as part of the eugenics movement. In vitro fertilization has some issues regarding its use of embryos. Some HD research has ethical issues due to its use of animal testing and embryonic stem cells.

The development of an accurate diagnostic test for HD has caused social, legal, and ethical concerns over access to and use of a person's results. Many guidelines and testing procedures have strict procedures for disclosure and confidentiality to allow individuals to decide when and how to receive their results and also to whom the results are made available. Insurance companies and businesses are faced with the question of whether to use genetic test results when assessing an individual, such as for life insurance or employment. The United Kingdom's insurance companies agreed with the Department of Health and Social Care that until 2017 customers would not need to disclose predictive genetics tests to them, but this agreement explicitly excluded the government-approved test for Huntington's when writing policies with a value over £500,000. As with other untreatable genetic conditions with a later onset, it is ethically questionable to perform presymptomatic testing on a child or adolescent since there would be no medical benefit for that individual. There is consensus for testing only individuals who are considered cognitively mature, although there is a counter-argument that parents have a right to make the decision on their child's behalf. With the lack of effective treatment, testing a person under legal age who is not judged to be competent is considered unethical in most cases.

There are ethical concerns related to prenatal genetic testing or preimplantation genetic diagnosis to ensure a child is not born with a given disease. For example, prenatal testing raises the issue of selective abortion, a choice considered unacceptable by some. As it is a dominant disease, there are difficulties in situations in which a parent does not want to know his or her own diagnosis. This would require parts of the process to be kept secret from the parent.

=== Support organizations ===
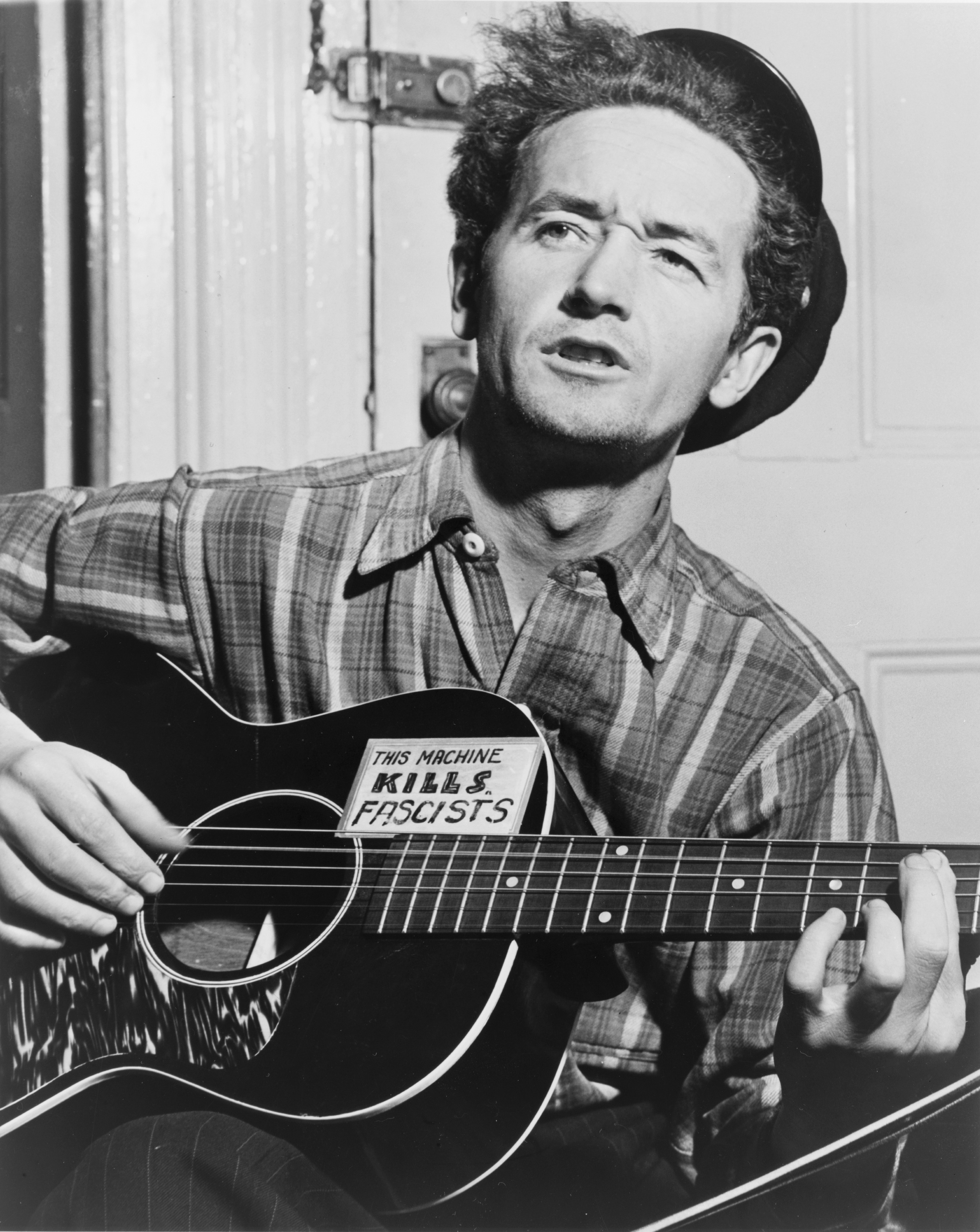
The death of Woody Guthrie led to the foundation of the Committee to Combat Huntington's Disease.

In 1968, after experiencing HD in his wife's family, Dr. Milton Wexler was inspired to start the Hereditary Disease Foundation (HDF), with the aim of curing genetic illnesses by coordinating and supporting research. The foundation and Wexler's daughter, Nancy Wexler, were key parts of the research team in Venezuela which discovered the HD gene.

At roughly the same time as the HDF formed, Marjorie Guthrie helped to found the committee to Combat Huntington's Disease (now the Huntington's Disease Society of America), after her husband, folk singer-songwriter Woody Guthrie died from complications of HD.

Since then, support and research organizations have formed in many countries around the world and have helped to increase public awareness of HD. A number of these collaborate in umbrella organizations, like the International Huntington Association and the European HD network. Many support organizations hold an annual HD awareness event, some of which have been endorsed by their respective governments. For example, 6 June is designated "National Huntington's Disease Awareness Day" by the US Senate. Many organizations exist to support and inform those affected by HD, including the Huntington's Disease Association in the UK. The largest funder of research is provided by the Cure Huntington's Disease Initiative Foundation (CHDI).

== Research directions ==
Research into the mechanism of HD is focused on identifying the functioning of Htt, how mHtt differs or interferes with it, and the brain pathology that the disease produces. Research is conducted using in vitro methods, genetically modified animals, (also called transgenic animal models), and human volunteers. Animal models are critical for understanding the fundamental mechanisms causing the disease, and for supporting the early stages of drug development. The identification of the causative gene has enabled the development of many genetically modified organisms including nematodes (roundworms), Drosophila fruit flies, and genetically modified mammals including mice, rats, sheep, pigs and monkeys that express mutant huntingtin and develop progressive neurodegeneration and HD-like symptoms.

Research is being conducted using many approaches to either prevent HD or slow its progression. Disease-modifying strategies can be broadly grouped into three categories: reducing the level of the mutant huntingtin protein (including gene splicing and gene silencing); approaches aimed at improving neuronal survival by reducing the harm caused by the protein to specific cellular pathways and mechanisms (including protein homeostasis and histone deacetylase inhibition); and strategies to replace lost neurons. In addition, novel therapies to improve brain functioning are under development; these seek to produce symptomatic rather than disease-modifying therapies, and include phosphodiesterase inhibitors.

The CHDI Foundation funds research initiatives providing many publications. The CHDI foundation is the largest funder of Huntington's disease research globally and aims to find and develop drugs that will slow the progression of HD. CHDI was formerly known as the High Q Foundation. In 2006, it spent $50 million on Huntington's disease research. CHDI collaborates with many academic and commercial laboratories globally and engages in oversight and management of research projects as well as funding.

A study found higher intelligence scores in children and young adults at risk for HD.

=== Reducing huntingtin production ===
Gene silencing aims to reduce the production of the mutant protein, since HD is caused by a single dominant gene encoding a toxic protein. Gene silencing experiments in mouse models have shown that when the expression of mHtt is reduced, symptoms improve. The safety of RNA interference and allele-specific oligonucleotide (ASO) methods of gene silencing have been demonstrated in mice and macaques. Allele-specific silencing approaches attempt to target mHTT while leaving wild-type HTT untouched by leveraging polymorphisms present on only the mutant allele.

The first gene silencing trial in humans with HD began in 2015, testing the safety of IONIS-HTTRx, produced by Ionis Pharmaceuticals and led by UCL Institute of Neurology. Mutant huntingtin was detected and quantified for the first time in cerebrospinal fluid from HD mutation-carriers in 2015 using a novel "single-molecule counting" immunoassay, providing a direct way to assess whether huntingtin-lowering treatments are achieving the desired effect. A phase 3 trial of this compound, renamed tominersen and sponsored by Roche Pharmaceuticals, began in 2019 but was halted in 2021 after the safety monitoring board concluded that the risk-benefit balance was unfavourable. A huntingtin-lowering gene therapy trial run by Dutch pharmaceutical company uniQure Biopharma began in 2019, and several trials of orally administered huntingtin-lowering splicing modulator compounds have been announced; of these, votoplam is through Phase 2 trial in 2025. Gene splicing techniques are being looked at to try to repair a genome with the erroneous gene that causes HD, using tools such as CRISPR/Cas9. PTC Therapeutics is evaluating small molecules that induce poison exon inclusion in HTT transcript as a therapeutic strategy to lower HTT expression.

In 2025, researchers at University College London reported preliminary results from AMT-130, a phase 1/2 uniQure huntingtin-lowering gene therapy clinical trial, that showed a 75% slowing of disease progression over three years; the full study data has not yet been released peer-reviewed nor published. AMT-130 is a gene therapy utilising adeno-associated virus serotype 5 (AAV5) vector carrying an artificial micro-RNA to silence the gene leading to a lowering of huntingtin protein expression. The therapy is delivered directly into the deep brain structures of the caudate nucleus and putamen via an MRI guided neurosurgical procedure.

=== Increasing huntingtin clearance ===
Another strategy to reduce the level of mutant huntingtin is to increase the rate at which cells are able to clear it. As mHTT (and many other protein aggregates) may be degraded by autophagy, increasing the rate of autophagy has the potential to reduce levels of mHTT and thereby ameliorate disease. Pharmacological and genetic inducers of autophagy have been tested in a variety of HD models; many have been shown to reduce mHtt levels and decrease toxicity in mice.

=== Improving cell survival ===
Among the approaches aimed at improving cell survival in the presence of mutant huntingtin are correction of transcriptional regulation using histone deacetylase inhibitors, modulating aggregation of huntingtin, improving metabolism and mitochondrial function and restoring function of synapses.

=== Neuronal replacement ===
Stem-cell therapy is used to replace damaged neurons by transplantation of stem cells into affected regions of the brain. Experiments in rat and mouse models of HD have yielded positive results. Stem cells are also used to study HD in the laboratory.

=== Ferroptosis ===
Ferroptosis is a form of regulated cell death characterized by the iron-dependent accumulation of lipid hydroperoxides to lethal levels. ALOX5-mediated ferroptosis acts as a cell death pathway upon oxidative stress in HD. Inhibitors of ferroptosis are protective in models of degenerative brain disorders, including Parkinson's, Huntington's, and Alzheimer's diseases.

=== Clinical trials ===
In 2020, there were 197 clinical trials related to varied therapies and biomarkers for HD listed as either underway, recruiting or newly completed. Compounds trialed that have failed to prevent or slow the progression of HD include remacemide, coenzyme Q_{10}, riluzole, creatine, minocycline, ethyl-EPA, phenylbutyrate and dimebon.

== See also ==
- AB-1001
- Childhood dementia
- Votoplam
