= Genocopy =

Genocopy is a trait that is a phenotypic copy of a genetic trait but is caused by a different genotype. When a genetic mutation or genotype in one locus results in a phenotype similar to one that is known to be caused by another mutation or genotype in another locus, it is said to be a genocopy. However, genocopies may also be referred to as "genetic mimics", in which the same mutation or specific genotype can result in two unique phenotypes in two different patients. The term "Genocopy" was coined by Dr. H. Nachstheim in 1957, in which he discusses "false" phenocopies. In comparison to when a phenotype is the result of an environmental condition that had the same effect as a previously known genetic factor such as mutation. While offspring may inherit specific mutations or genotypes that result in genocopies, phenocopies are not heritable. Two types of elliptocytosis that are genocopies of each other, but are distinguished by the fact that one is linked to the Rh blood group locus and the other is not. The way to distinguish a recessive genocopy from a phenotype caused by a different allele would be by carrying out a test cross, breeding the two together, if they F1 hybrid segregates 1:2:1 then we can determine that it was a genocopy.

== Examples ==
=== Mitochondrial diseases ===
Since Mitochondria carry out such a variety of functions in different tissues, there are often hundreds of Mitochondrial diseases that might be harder to diagnose in early stages. Considering that there is a complex relationship between cells and genes to have metabolism at its optimum, identical Mitochondrial DNA mutations may not show up as identical diseases. Genocopies are often seen as diseases that might be caused by the same mutation but do not result in identical expression. Diseases associated with mtDNA are often as a result of mutations in tRNA that play a role in Mitochondrial protein synthesis. These mutations that change protein-encoding genes or both. How each category of cause of Mitochondrial disease produces genocopies is still unknown.

=== DiGeorge syndrome ===
The genocopy event between TBX1 and 22q11.2 mutations is one that shows grave symptoms. The 22q11.2 mutation leads to DiGeorge or velocardiofacial syndromes. Similarly, the mutations in the TBX1 genome exhibit the same symptoms. The TBX1 haploinsufficiency is responsible for many of the traits that are also seen in 22q11.2 mutations. It has 2 mutations that are similar to the two mutations of 22q11.2 - deletion and duplication. The first mutation is L411P and is a de novo mutation. This mutation affects a conserved amino acid within a putative transactivation domain and is likely to affect the protein's functionality. The second mutation is one that converts a cytosine to thymine in the 5' UTR region of the TBX1 gene. This mutation increases TBX1 translational efficiency during key points in development, which is the functional equivalent to 22q11.2 duplication. This shows us that genocopy is not just a discrete genomic event but can also be seen in serious diseases.

== See also ==
- phenocopy
