= JPH1 =

Protein-coding gene in the species Homo sapiens

Identifiers
- Aliases: JPH1, JP-1, JP1, CMT2K, junctophilin 1
- External IDs: OMIM: 605266; MGI: 1891495; GeneCards: JPH1

Gene location (Human)
Chr.	Chromosome 8 (human)
Band	8q21.11	Start	74,234,700 bp
Band	8q21.11	End	74,321,540 bp

Gene location (Mouse)
Chr.	Chromosome 1 (mouse)
Band	1|1 A3	Start	17,034,784 bp
Band	1|1 A3	End	17,168,113 bp
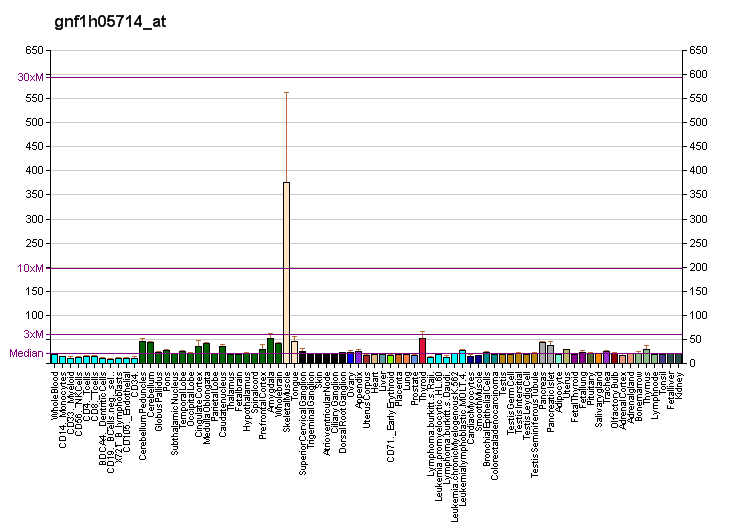
RNA expression pattern
Bgee	Human / Mouse (ortholog); Top expressed in: quadriceps femoris muscle; vastus lateralis muscle; tibialis anterior muscle; Skeletal muscle tissue of biceps brachii; deltoid muscle; Skeletal muscle tissue of rectus abdominis; gastrocnemius muscle; muscle of thigh; body of tongue; endothelial cell / Top expressed in: triceps brachii muscle; sternocleidomastoid muscle; temporal muscle; digastric muscle; ankle; muscle of thigh; intercostal muscle; soleus muscle; skeletal muscle tissue; medial head of gastrocnemius muscle; More reference expression data
BioGPS	More reference expression data
Gene ontology
Molecular function	structural constituent of muscle; molecular function; calcium-release channel activity
Cellular component	sarcoplasmic reticulum membrane; endoplasmic reticulum membrane; plasma membrane; membrane; sarcoplasmic reticulum; junctional sarcoplasmic reticulum membrane; integral component of membrane; junctional membrane complex; endoplasmic reticulum; Z discdkac; nucleus; nucleoplasm
Biological process	regulation of ryanodine-sensitive calcium-release channel activity; muscle organ development; calcium ion transport into cytosol; release of sequestered calcium ion into cytosol
Sources:Amigo / QuickGO
Orthologs
Databases	NCBI: entry; OMA: entry
Species	Human	Mouse
Entrez	56704	57339
Ensembl	ENSG00000104369	ENSMUSG00000042686
UniProt	Q9HDC5; Q86VR1	Q9ET80
RefSeq (mRNA)	NM_020647; NM_001317830; NM_001363050; NM_001363051	NM_020604
RefSeq (protein)	NP_001304759; NP_065698; NP_001349979; NP_001349980; NP_065698.1	NP_065629
Location (UCSC)	Chr 8: 74.23 – 74.32 Mb	Chr 1: 17.03 – 17.17 Mb
PubMed search
- Wikidata
View/Edit Human	View/Edit Mouse

Junctophilin-1 is a protein that in humans is encoded by the JPH1 gene.

Junctional complexes between the plasma membrane and endoplasmic/sarcoplasmic reticulum are a common feature of all excitable cell types and mediate cross talk between cell surface and intracellular ion channels. The protein encoded by this gene is a component of junctional complexes and is composed of a C-terminal hydrophobic segment spanning the endoplasmic/sarcoplasmic reticulum membrane and a remaining cytoplasmic domain that shows specific affinity for the plasma membrane. This gene is a member of the junctophilin gene family.
