= Phenocopy =

Variation in phenotype caused by environmental conditions

Chocolate-colored male Himalayan rabbit

In phenomics, a phenocopy is a variation in phenotype (generally referring to a single trait) which is caused by environmental conditions (often, but not necessarily, during the organism's development), such that the organism's phenotype matches a phenotype which is determined by genetic factors. It is not a type of mutation, as it is non-hereditary.

The term was coined by German geneticist Richard Goldschmidt in 1935. He used it to refer to forms, produced by some experimental procedure, whose appearance duplicates or copies the phenotype of some mutant or combination of mutants.

== Examples ==
The butterfly genus Vanessa can change phenotype based on the local temperature. If introduced to Lapland they mimic butterflies localised to this area; and if localised to Syria they mimic butterflies of this area.

The larvae of Drosophila melanogaster have been found to be particularly vulnerable to environmental factors which produce phenocopies of known mutations; these factors include temperature, shock, radiation, and various chemical compounds. In fruit fly, Drosophila melanogaster, the normal body colour is brownish gray with black margins. A hereditary mutant for this was discovered by T.H. Morgan in 1910 where the body colour is yellow. This was a genotypic character which was constant in both the flies in all environments. However, in 1939, Rapoport discovered that if larvae of normal flies were fed with silver salts, they develop into yellow bodied flies irrespective of their genotype. The yellow bodied flies which are genetically brown is a variant of the original yellow bodied fly.

Phenocopy can also be observed in Himalayan rabbits. When raised in moderate temperatures, Himalayan rabbits are white in colour with black tail, nose, and ears, making them phenotypically distinguishable from genetically black rabbits. However, when raised in cold temperatures, Himalayan rabbits show black colouration of their coats, resembling the genetically black rabbits. Hence this Himalayan rabbit is a phenocopy of the genetically black rabbit.

Reversible and/or cosmetic modifications such as the use of hair bleach are not considered to be phenocopy, as they are not inherent traits.

== See also ==
- Genocopy
