= JPH3 =

Protein-coding gene in humans

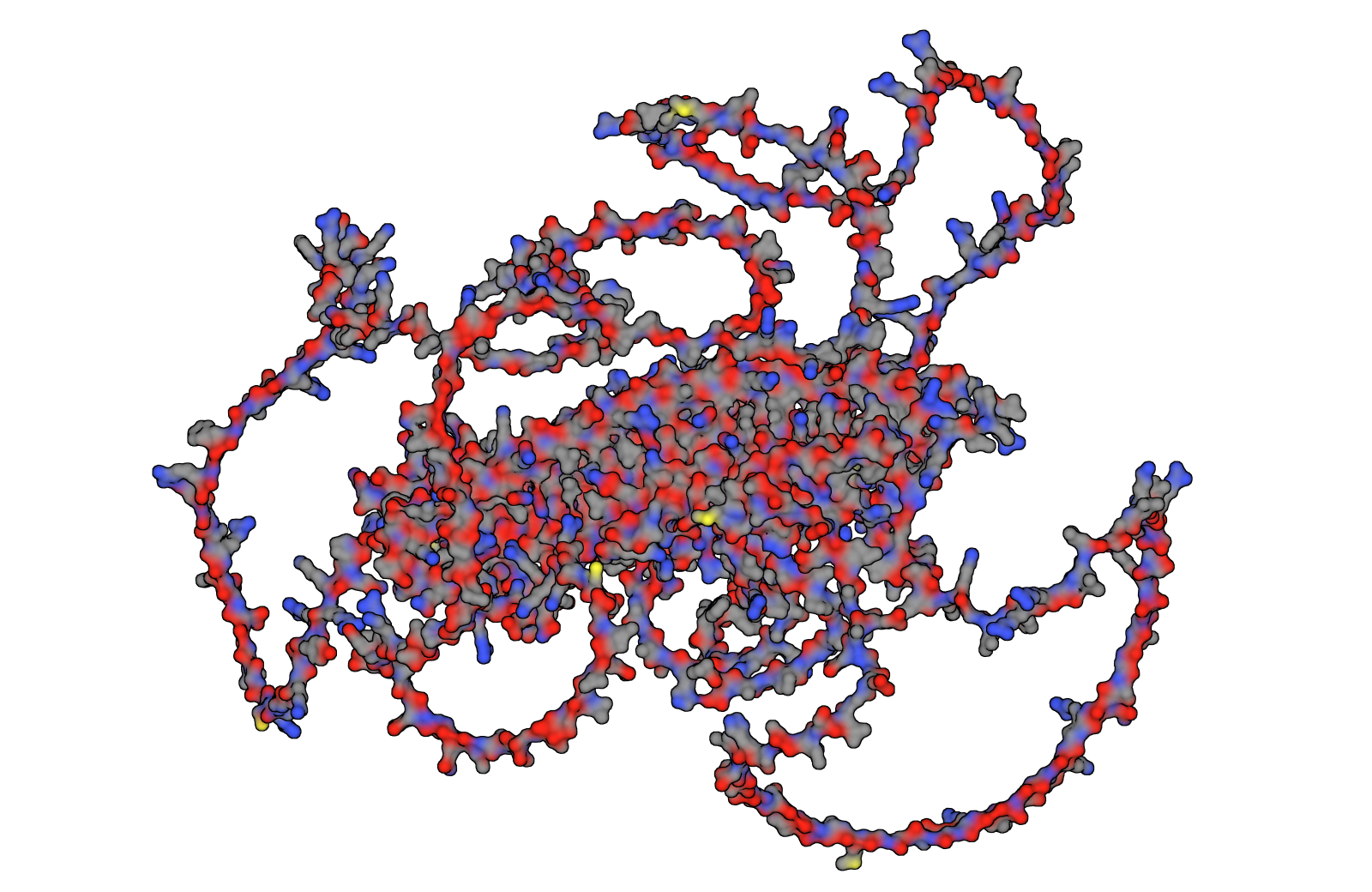
- Junctophilin-3

Identifiers
- Aliases: JPH3, CAGL237, HDL2, JP-3, JP3, TNRC22, junctophilin 3
- External IDs: OMIM: 605268; MGI: 1891497; GeneCards: JPH3

Gene location (Human)
Chr.	Chromosome 16 (human)
Band	16q24.2	Start	87,601,835 bp
Band	16q24.2	End	87,698,156 bp

Gene location (Mouse)
Chr.	Chromosome 8 (mouse)
Band	8|8 E1	Start	122,456,362 bp
Band	8|8 E1	End	122,521,015 bp
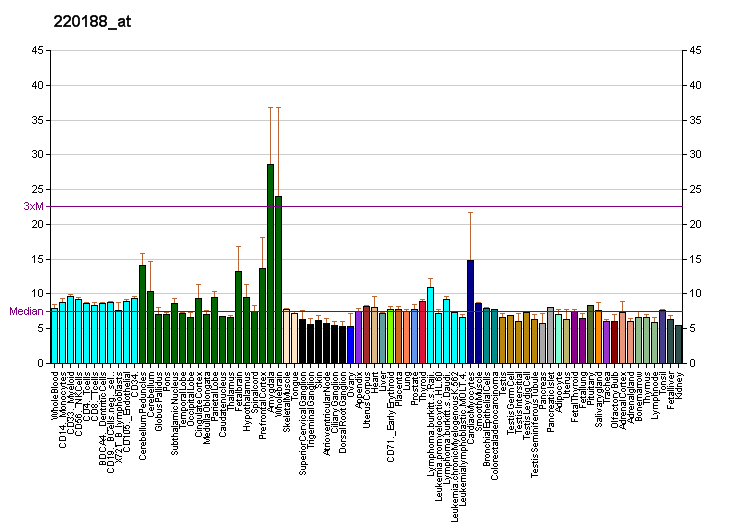
RNA expression pattern
Bgee	Human / Mouse (ortholog); Top expressed in: right frontal lobe; postcentral gyrus; anterior cingulate cortex; sural nerve; entorhinal cortex; superior frontal gyrus; nucleus accumbens; amygdala; dorsolateral prefrontal cortex; prefrontal cortex / Top expressed in: CA3 field; entorhinal cortex; perirhinal cortex; dentate gyrus; cingulate gyrus; superior frontal gyrus; primary visual cortex; primary motor cortex; Region I of hippocampus proper; dentate gyrus of hippocampal formation granule cell; More reference expression data
BioGPS	More reference expression data
Gene ontology
Molecular function	calcium-release channel activity; molecular function
Cellular component	plasma membrane; endoplasmic reticulum; endoplasmic reticulum membrane; membrane; junctional sarcoplasmic reticulum membrane; junctional membrane complex; integral component of membrane
Biological process	regulation of neuronal synaptic plasticity; release of sequestered calcium ion into cytosol; calcium ion transport into cytosol; memory; learning; exploration behavior; locomotion; neuromuscular process controlling balance; regulation of ryanodine-sensitive calcium-release channel activity; regulation of synaptic plasticity
Sources:Amigo / QuickGO
Orthologs
Databases	NCBI: entry; OMA: entry
Species	Human	Mouse
Entrez	57338	57340
Ensembl	ENSG00000154118	ENSMUSG00000025318
UniProt	Q8WXH2	Q9ET77
RefSeq (mRNA)	NM_001271604; NM_001271605; NM_020655	NM_020605
RefSeq (protein)	NP_001258533; NP_001258534; NP_065706	NP_065630
Location (UCSC)	Chr 16: 87.6 – 87.7 Mb	Chr 8: 122.46 – 122.52 Mb
PubMed search
- Wikidata
View/Edit Human	View/Edit Mouse

Junctophilin-3 (JPH3) is a protein residing in humans that is encoded by the JPH3 gene. The gene is approximately 97 kilobases long and is located at chromosomal position 16q24.2. Junctophilin proteins are associated with the formation of junctional membrane complexes, which link the plasma membrane with the endoplasmic reticulum in excitable cells. JPH3 is localized to the brain and is associated with motor coordination and memory neurons.

The protein contains 748 residues and is composed of a C-terminal hydrophobic segment that spans the endoplasmic/sarcoplasmic reticulum membrane and a cytoplasmic domain that displays specific affinity for the plasma membrane, as well as several membrane occupation and recognition nexus repeats involved in plasma membrane binding through interactions with phospholipids.

JPH3 is primarily expressed in the brain, specifically in the dorsolateral prefrontal cortex. Although the precise function of the protein has not been determined, it has been shown to play a role in motor coordination and memory through calcium ion signaling and the stabilization of neuronal cellular architecture.

The JPH3 gene contains a CAG/CTG trinucleotide repeat segment. Expansion of this segment in various genes can cause polyglutamine diseases. The expansion of the CAG tandem repeat in JPH3 is associated with the HDL2's type of Huntington's disease-like syndrome. The pathological expansion of the CAG repeat region leads to an expanded polyglutamine tract, which can aggregate in neurons, leading to the degeneration of neuronal subpopulations.
