= JPH4 =

Protein-coding gene in the species Homo sapiens

Identifiers
- Aliases: JPH4, JP4, JPHL1, junctophilin 4
- External IDs: MGI: 2443113; GeneCards: JPH4

Gene location (Human)
Chr.	Chromosome 14 (human)
Band	14q11.2	Start	23,568,038 bp
Band	14q11.2	End	23,578,790 bp

Gene location (Mouse)
Chr.	Chromosome 14 (mouse)
Band	14|14 C3	Start	55,344,283 bp
Band	14|14 C3	End	55,354,392 bp
RNA expression pattern
Bgee	Human / Mouse (ortholog); Top expressed in: superior frontal gyrus; right hemisphere of cerebellum; right frontal lobe; nucleus accumbens; dorsolateral prefrontal cortex; temporal lobe; amygdala; primary visual cortex; anterior cingulate cortex; prefrontal cortex / Top expressed in: dentate gyrus of hippocampal formation granule cell; superior frontal gyrus; visual cortex; primary visual cortex; olfactory tubercle; hippocampus proper; nucleus accumbens; Region I of hippocampus proper; piriform cortex; subiculum; More reference expression data
BioGPS	n/a
Gene ontology
Molecular function	calcium-release channel activity
Cellular component	dendritic shaft; integral component of membrane; plasma membrane; endoplasmic reticulum; endoplasmic reticulum membrane; membrane; junctional sarcoplasmic reticulum membrane; smooth endoplasmic reticulum; junctional membrane complex
Biological process	regulation of ryanodine-sensitive calcium-release channel activity; calcium ion transport into cytosol; learning; neuromuscular process controlling balance; regulation of synaptic plasticity; regulation of cytokine production; regulation of store-operated calcium entry; release of sequestered calcium ion into cytosol
Sources:Amigo / QuickGO
Orthologs
Databases	NCBI: entry; OMA: entry
Species	Human	Mouse
Entrez	84502	319984
Ensembl	ENSG00000092051	ENSMUSG00000022208
UniProt	Q96JJ6	Q80WT0
RefSeq (mRNA)	NM_032452; NM_001146028	NM_001003829; NM_177049
RefSeq (protein)	NP_001139500; NP_115828	NP_796023
Location (UCSC)	Chr 14: 23.57 – 23.58 Mb	Chr 14: 55.34 – 55.35 Mb
PubMed search
- Wikidata
View/Edit Human	View/Edit Mouse

Junctophilin 4 is a protein in humans that is encoded by the JPH4 gene.

This gene encodes a member of the junctophilin family of transmembrane proteins that are involved in the formation of the junctional membrane complexes between the plasma membrane and the endoplasmic/sarcoplasmic reticulum in excitable cells. The encoded protein contains a conserved N-terminal repeat region called the membrane occupation and recognition nexus sequence that is found in other members of the junctophilin family. Alternative splicing results in multiple transcript variants. [provided by RefSeq, Mar 2009].
