= Benign hereditary chorea =

Benign hereditary chorea (BHC)
- Other names: Benign familial chorea
- Symptoms: Low muscle tone, involuntary movements, motor and vocal tics
- Usual onset: Noticeable by 2.5 - 3 years
- Duration: Lifetime
- Causes: Mutations of the TITF1 gene
- Diagnostic method: Based on symptoms, genetic testing
- Medication: Supportive care
- Frequency: 1:500,000

Benign hereditary chorea (BHC), also known as benign familial chorea, is a rare autosomal dominant neurogenetic syndrome. It typically presents itself in childhood with isolated chorea, with average to below average intelligence. Unlike other neurogenetic causes of chorea such as Huntington's disease, BHC is not progressive, and not associated with cognitive decline or psychiatric problems in the vast majority of cases.

The first description of BHC was reported in 1967 in an African American family from Mississippi. Two brothers reportedly had delayed motor development in childhood and were diagnosed with chorea.

These findings were reaffirmed by other families reporting similar traits and an autosomal dominant pattern of inheritance was suggested. However, heterogeneity in the presentations of the affected individuals made confirmation of these diagnoses of BHC difficult to prove. Features reported in these families, including dystonia, tremor, and myoclonus, led researchers to question whether BHC actually represents different diagnoses with similar phenotypes inappropriately grouped together.

Further research in 2000 confirmed a connection between a Dutch family reporting similar characteristics of BHC and one of the original families. The investigators identified a linkage to a disease locus on the long arm of chromosome 14 from this connection.

== Signs and symptoms ==
Benign Hereditary Chorea is characterized by early onset of an abnormal gait, speech articulation difficulties, anxiety, and chorea.

The clinical spectrum of symptoms resulting from BHC is vast, manifesting as thyroid agenesis to dysarthria to distress syndrome. As a result, genetic testing is the only way to confirm the syndrome.

BHC is caused by a single-nucleotide substitution mutation in TITF1, which encodes thyroid transcription factor 1 (TTF-1) and is inherited in an autosomal dominant pattern. This gene is also known as NK2 homeobox 1 (NKX2-1) The single-nucleotide substitution mutation then ultimately has drastic effects on the maturation processes of TITF-1

In some cases, additional developmental abnormalities of lung and thyroid tissue are found in BHC, leading to the suggested alternative name brain-lung-thyroid syndrome.

== Genetics ==
Benign Hereditary Chorea is an autosomal dominant disorder. It is believed to be caused by a single-nucleotide substitution in TITF1, located on chromosome 14. A wide spectrum of mutations have been reported, drawing a potential association between amount of subsequently deleted nucleotides to severity of symptoms. These mutations lead to protein truncation, prevent DNA binding, and a loss-of-function. Mutations of the gene affect namely the lungs, brain, and thyroid. This is because during embryonic development, NKX2.1 plays a key role in binding to transcriptional regulatory elements and proteins within those respective organs.

== Diagnosis ==
BHC begins showing symptoms during childhood, and is commonly a familial disorder. This is a disorder that is correlated with mutations in the thyroid transcription factor gene (TITF-1).

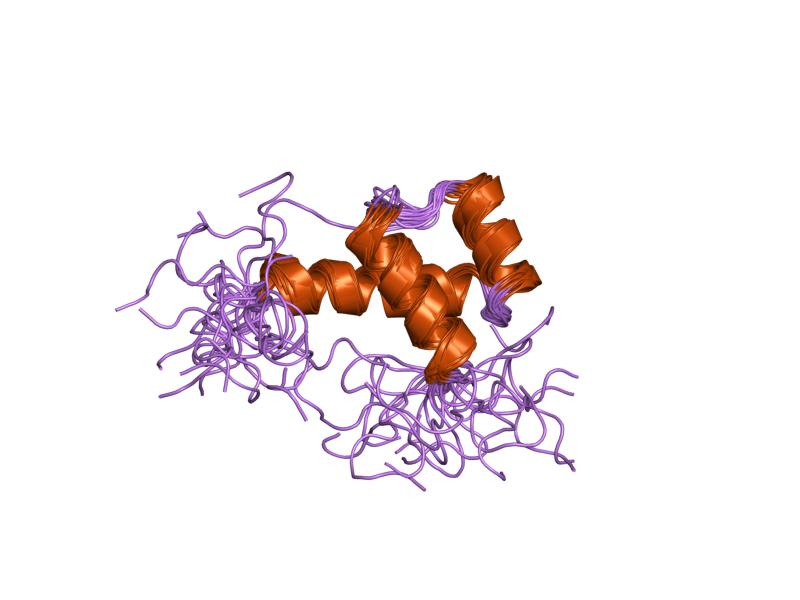
Thyroid transcription factor associated with BHC

The disorder was discovered in 1960s. During the time of its discovery, there were no tests that could be used to confirm a diagnosis of the disorder, and the phenotype was not easy to distinguish from other disorders. This resulted in the existence of the disorder being questioned. However, in 2002, the experimentally observed mutation of the gene leading to the BHC phenotype was identified, solidifying benign hereditary chorea as a disorder.

In 1967, several families were examined and discovered to have movements that were abnormal and random since childhood. These random movements were not violent movements, and gave the person a "general appearance of restlessness." The movements occurred mostly in the hands and arms, and some also experienced them in their tongues, facial muscles, and lower body. Movements in the lower extremities, if severe enough, could cause changes in gait. The families were given a Wechsler Intelligence Scale test, scoring average relative to others in their community. Aside from the aforementioned symptoms, the peoples' physical and neurological characteristics were normal. The observed symptoms were put in the category of chorea.

Researchers made pedigrees of the families they studied and determined that BHC was an autosomal dominant disorder. By studying a Dutch family, the disorder was discovered to be linked to chromosome 14. In 2002, an Italian family was studied, and they had the same linkage to chromosome 14 as the Dutch family did. Looking closer at the region of the chromosome suspected of causing the disorder, researchers discovered that there was a 1.2 Mb deletion in the DNA that resulted in the loss of the TITF-1 gene. This meant that mutations in the TITF-1 gene were likely the reason behind the symptoms of BHC.

Currently, BHC is diagnosed through the identification of the phenotypic symptoms with a genetic test to confirm the mutation in the TITF-1 gene.

== Management ==
There are no cures for benign hereditary chorea, but there are several medications that have been shown to treat the symptoms of the disorder. Levodopa has been shown to improve the effects of chorea on a patient's gait within 6 weeks of starting treatments. However, this medication did have the side effect of "dose-dependent dyskinesia." Methylphenidate has also been used to improve chorea symptoms. Steroids have been used to treat BHC, but due to the presence of dystonia, it is questionable whether these patients actually had BHC.

== Epidemiology ==
In 1978, BHC was reported to have a frequency of 1:500,000 within a Welsh population, but due to how some symptoms are hard to distinguish, it was concluded that the number is underrespresentative of actual clinical cases. Results for correlation between sex and distribution of the disorder are inconclusive.

== See also ==
- Chorea
- Huntington's disease
