= Tourettism =

Tics in the absence of Tourette syndrome

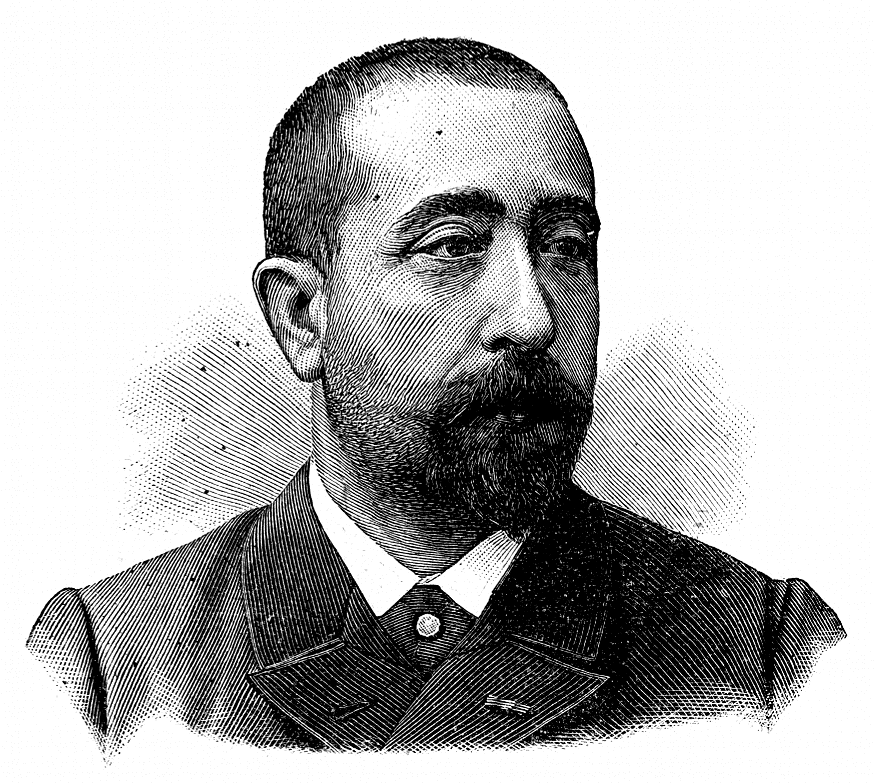
Portrait of Georges Gilles de la Tourette (1857–1904), who published in 1885 an account of nine patients with a "convulsive tic disorder".

Tourettism refers to the presence of Tourette-like symptoms in the absence of Tourette syndrome, as the result of other diseases or conditions, known as "secondary causes".

Tourette syndrome (TS) is an inherited neurological condition of multiple motor and at least one vocal tic. Although Tourette syndrome is the most common cause of tic disorders, other sporadic, genetic, and neurodegenerative disorders may also exhibit tics.

Conditions that may manifest tics or stereotyped movements include developmental disorders; autism spectrum disorders and stereotypic movement disorder; Sydenham's chorea; idiopathic dystonia; and genetic conditions such as Huntington's disease, neuroacanthocytosis, pantothenate kinase-associated neurodegeneration, Duchenne muscular dystrophy, Wilson's disease, and tuberous sclerosis. Other possibilities include chromosomal disorders such as Down syndrome, Klinefelter syndrome, XYY syndrome and fragile X syndrome. Acquired causes of tics include drug-induced tics, head trauma, encephalitis, stroke, and carbon monoxide poisoning. The symptoms of Lesch–Nyhan syndrome may also be confused with Tourette syndrome.

== Tic mimickers ==
- Chorea (disease)
- Myoclonus
- Dystonia
  - Torsion dystonia
  - Idiopathic dystonia

== Genetic/chromosomal ==
- Chromosomal abnormalities
- Citrullinemia
- Down syndrome
- Duchenne muscular dystrophy
- Fragile X syndrome
- Pantothenate kinase-associated neurodegeneration
- Huntington's disease
- Klinefelter syndrome
- Lesch–Nyhan syndrome
- Neuroacanthocytosis
- Neurodegeneration
- Phenylketonuria
- Schizophrenia
- Tuberous sclerosis
- Wilson's disease
- XYY syndrome

== Infectious or post-infectious ==
- Encephalitis
- Mycoplasma pneumoniae
- Sydenham's chorea

== Developmental ==
- Pervasive developmental disorders
  - Asperger syndrome
  - Autism spectrum
  - Rett syndrome
- Intellectual disability
- Static encephalopathy
- Stereotypic movement disorder

== Toxins/insults/acquired ==
- Carbon monoxide poisoning
- Cerebral palsy
- Creutzfeldt–Jakob disease
- Fetal alcohol syndrome
- Head trauma
- Hypoglycemia
- Intrauterine exposure to illicit drugs
- Intrauterine infections
- Mercury
- Neurocutaneous syndromes
- Neurosyphilis
- Perinatal asphyxia
- Psychogenic disease
- Stroke
- Wasp venom

=== Drugs ===
- Cocaine
- Levodopa (Dopar, Larodopa)
- Antiepileptics Carbamazepine (Atretol, Epitol, Tegretol)
- Lamotrigine (Lamictal)
- Amphetamines
- Pemoline
- Phenytoin (Dilantin)
- Phenobarbital
- Antipsychotics (e.g.; haloperidol)
