= Massed negative practice =

Proposed type of behaviour therapy

Massed negative practice is a proposed treatment for the tics of Tourette syndrome in which the individual with Tourette's "practices" tics continuously until a conditioned level of fatigue is reached. It is based upon the Hullian learning theory, which holds that tics are "maladaptive habits that are strengthened by repetition and can be replaced by the strengthening of more adaptive habits (i.e., not having tics)". There is little evidence supporting its efficacy in the treatment of tics.
