= Tourette's Disorder Scale =

Psychological instrument

The Tourette's Disorder Scale (TODS) is a psychological instrument to assess tics and co-occurring conditions in Tourette syndrome (TS).

There are two versions of TODS: TODS-CR (clinician-rated) and TODS-PR (parent-rated). Each version is a 15-item scale that helps clinicians evaluate the severity of symptoms that may be associated with tics—inattention, hyperactivity, obsessions, compulsions, aggression and mood disturbances.

== Use and features ==
TODS is one of many instruments used to assess symptoms associated with tics. The Yale Global Tic Severity Scale (YGTSS) is regarded as the most developed instrument for assessing tics and is widely accepted as the standard; TODS is one of several other reliable and comprehensive instruments.

TODS differs from other instruments in that it measures tic severity as well as behavioral and emotional symptoms that may accompany TS. According to a systematic review by Martino, et al (2017), TODS is the "only 'recommended' severity scale to measure also comorbid behavioral symptoms (inattention, hyperactivity, obsessions, compulsions, aggression, and emotional symptoms), but has lower internal consistency and interrater reliability than the YGTSS".

The 15 symptoms rated by TODS include tics as well as obsessions and compulsions; attentional difficulties, restlessness and impulsiveness; and depression, anxiousness, aggression and other mood or behavioral issues.

== Development ==
In a 2003 study by Shytle and colleagues, a survey was sent to parents from a TS group email list, asking them to rate the frequency and relative significance of 32 behavioral and emotional symptoms observed in their children. Of 35 respondents, 80% concurred that behavioral and emotional symptoms were more afflicting than tics.

Symptoms discerned as frequently disruptive to persons with TS and rated as a "top 10" problem by over 25% of participants in the study (parents and clinicians) were included in the construction of TODS. Two versions of TODs were established, one using parental ratings (PR) and the other using clinician ratings (CR).

=== TODS-PR ===
For the development of the parent-rated version of TODS, parents of individuals with tics subjectively rated symptom severity in accordance with their observations over fixed time periods.

=== TODS-CR ===
In developing the clinician-rated version of TODS, a semi-structured interview was conducted by clinicians in those with TS and their parents. After using the MINI-KID (child and adolescent version of the Mini International Neuropsychiatric Interview) to determine the presence of TS and comorbidities, clinicians posed questions to the children. Following, parents were asked to contribute to the responses, until clinicians reached an agreement on the rating of each symptom.

== Validity ==
A 2007 study by Storch, et al, of 44 children suggested that tic factors in TODS and YGTSS are significantly and positively correlated. Parents and clinicians typically agreed with each other on symptom ratings.

On the attention deficit hyperactivity disorder factor and TODS total score, clinicians rated the distress to individuals with tics as significantly greater than parents did. Explanations for this discrepancy mainly highlighted clinicians' greater level of detachment compared to parents, allowing them to be more objective in assessment and attuned to the distress of the individual with tics.

== Limitations ==
TODS is unable to measure various aspects of tics to the extent that other instruments do. Only assessing the overall severity of tics, TODS is unable to capture information regarding the frequency, intensity and complexity of the tics, resulting in a lack of precision in symptom measurement. Furthermore, TODS requires over 20 minutes for administration compared to an average of 10 minutes in other instruments, making a more lengthy diagnostic process.

The reliability of TODS, like many other instruments, has been tested with a largely Caucasian sample of patients, resulting in low generalizability of findings.
