= Autism – Tics, AD/HD, and other Comorbidities =

Psychological measure

The Autism – Tics, ADHD, and other Comorbidities Inventory (A–TAC) is a screening questionnaire directed towards parents of children and/or adolescents with suspected neurodevelopmental disorders, which are present in 7-10% of children. Originally developed as a questionnaire by Christopher Gillberg, Maria Råstam and Henrik Anckarsäter, it has been adapted into a telephone-conducted interview for the primary purpose of screening individuals for symptoms prior to their diagnostic interviews, but now has been incorporated into clinical practices. However, it is not authorised to be used as a stand-alone measure. It is able to screen for autism spectrum disorder, tic disorders, attention Deficit Hyperactivity Disorder (ADHD), developmental coordination disorders and learning disorders. One telephone survey found it was not validated for eating disorders.

A-TAC assesses a number of interrelated disorders. This screening tool is freely accessible, a feature that benefits countries or practices that lack access to trained psychiatric professionals.

The telephone interview adaption of Gillberg's questionnaire is part of the Child and Adolescent Twin Study in Sweden (CATSS) - a longitudinal study aimed to assess somatic and mental health disorders that arise and present themselves during childhood. Thus, the A-TAC is a valued tool that has contributed to reliable early screening of Neurodevelopmental disorders.

== Development ==
Developed at the University of Gothenburg by Christopher Gillberg and colleagues, the A-TAC is able to be conducted as a clinical telephone interview, as well as an in-person interview. Whilst originally developed in Swedish, it is available in multiple languages (English, French, Spanish) on the Swedish Child Neuropsychiatry Science Foundation. Questions include "almost verbatim" the characteristics listed in the DSM-IV diagnostic definitions of disorders for several conditions. The Spanish version has been independently validated for screen purposes, and was concluded a valid and reliable tool to assess autism.

The preliminary version of the A-TAC, also known as the pilot study intended to predict its validity for future practices, consisted of 178 items. The parents of 84 clinically diagnosed children and 27 control children aged 6–19 were contacted to participate in a this preliminary validation of the A-TAC telephone interview, which was conducted by two medical students within 35 minutes. This effectively minimised adverse effects on answers due to the fatigue effect, where interviewees may experience deteriorating accuracy in responses due to tiredness. This preliminary version was concluded to be valid and reliable in assessing symptoms of Neurodevelopmental Disorders, and consequently the telephone interview was incorporated into the CATSS.

The updated and current version of the A-TAC has been adjusted to target children aged between 9 and 12, as this age range is deal for identifying childhood Neurodevelopmental Disorders whilst avoiding the risk of overlapping puberty-related issues. This reduces the rate of misdiagnoses.

== Scale and Scoring ==
The A-TAC consists of 20 modules of the range of symptoms screened for. They are as follows;

- Motor Control
- Perception
- Concentration & Attention
- Impulsiveness & Activity
- Learning, Planning & Organising
- Memory
- Language
- Social Interaction
- Flexibility
- Tics
- Compulsions
- Feeding
- Separation
- Opposition
- Conduct
- Anxiety
- Mood
- Concept of Reality
- Miscellaneous

Separated through these 20 modules, the inventory holds 264 items which are divided between 96 "gate" questions, and the remaining follow-up questions. "Gate" questions address the salient features, meaning the most obvious symptoms that will manifest as a representation of each module which the parent participating in the interview would notice and report. During this telephone interview, parents of the child/twin are prompted to answer each "gate" question with either;

- (0) No
- (0.5) Yes, to some extent
- (1) Yes

If parents respond with "Yes" or "Yes, to some extent" the interviewer proceeds to follow-up questions for that specific module. Alternatively, if the "gate" question/s for that module are answered with "No", that module is considered an irrelevant symptom to the screening of disorders. When a module is completed, four final questions are asked to ascertain the extent of difficulty that accompanies a symptom. The questions are as follows;

1. Has it caused dysfunction in school, among peers or at home?
2. Has it caused significant suffering?
3. When did it begin? (age)
4. Is it still present?

== Validity ==
=== Gender differences ===
Autism, one of the primary disorders screened for using the A-TAC, has evidence of presenting differently in males and females. One reason for this is that autism is able to present with different phenotypes in different genders. This means that the same trait, e.g. having a special interest, will present differently in males and females (books vs. rocks), and therefore raises issues as to whether there will be a gendered bias in identification of symptoms within the autism domain within the A-TAC modules.

A study by (Mårland et al., 2022) assessed this autism domain and concluded that of 17 items targeting autism symptoms, 6 were concluded to have differential diagnostic functions between females and males with an equal split of 3 biased items per gender. Due to the equal split and 6 out of 17 items being considered a minimal difference, it was concluded that sex-specific scoring methods were not necessary. The A-TAC was validated for accurate screening of autism for both genders.

=== Predictive ability ===
A study by (Larson et al., 2013) recruited twins from the CATSS who were screened using the A-TAC at age 9 or 12, for a follow-up clinical examination at age 15, referencing DSM criteria. This 3 year gap was implemented to assess the longevity of the predictive ability of the A-TAC in diagnoses of Neurodevelopmental disorders. Results concluded that 55% of children with a positive A-TAC screening received an official diagnosis according to the DSM. This indicated excellent predictive ability, solidifying the validity of A-TAC in screening, particularly for autism. It also relevant that participants often received more than one diagnoses, due to the nature of comorbidity that childhood presenting Neurodevelopmental disorders have. This is a strength unique to the A-TACs broad assessment of symptoms and acknowledgement of co-existing problems that are shared between disorders.

== Limitations ==
The assessments on the validity of the A-TAC were conducted with sample populations from the Child and Adolescent Twin Study of Sweden (CATSS), consequently, its findings are limited in one aspect that twins are not representative of the greater population, limiting its generalisability. Additionally, while it has been determined valid in its Spanish translation, other contexts have not been tested, further limiting generalisability to varying cultural contexts.

All interviews face similar risks of biases, such as social desirability biases, where parents responding may not respond truthfully to fit into what they consider socially acceptable responses - they may not deem the child's behaviour in-line, or of great distance from social norms. This limits the validity of results from the A-TAC, but this is to an extent balanced by supporting diagnoses and measures, due to how the A-TAC cannot be used as a stand-alone measure.
