= Premonitory Urge for Tics Scale =

Psychological measurement

The Premonitory Urge for Tics Scale (PUTS) is a psychological measure used to assess premonitory urges preceding tics in tic disorders. It is not recommended for children ten and under.
