= Palilalia =

Language disorder characterized by involuntary repetition

Palilalia, (Note: from the Greek πάλιν (pálin) meaning "again" and λαλιά (laliá) meaning "speech" or "to talk")l) a complex tic, is a language disorder characterized by the involuntary repetition of syllables, words, or phrases. It has features resembling other complex tics such as echolalia or coprolalia, but, unlike other aphasias, palilalia is based upon contextually correct speech.

It was originally described by Alexandre-Achille Souques in a patient with a stroke that resulted in left-side hemiplegia, although a condition described as auto-echolalia in 1899 by Édouard Brissaud may have been the same condition.

== Classification ==
Palilalia is considered an aphasia, a disorder of language, and is not to be confused with speech disorders, as there is no difficulty in the formation of internal speech. Palilalia is similar to speech disorders such as stuttering or cluttering, as it tends to express itself only in spontaneous speech, such as answering basic questions, and not in automatic speech such as reading or singing; however, it distinctively affects words and phrases rather than syllables and sounds.

Palilalia may occur in conditions affecting the prefrontal cortex or basal ganglia regions, either from physical trauma, neurodegenerative disorders, genetic disorders, or a loss of dopamine in these brain regions. Palilalia occurs most commonly in Tourette syndrome and may be present in neurodegenerative disorders like Alzheimer's disease and progressive supranuclear palsy.

== Characteristics ==
Palilalia is defined as the repetition of the speaker's words or phrases, often for a varying number of repeats. Repeated units are generally whole sections of words and are larger than a syllable, with words being repeated the most often, followed by phrases, and then syllables or sounds. Palilalic repetitions are often spoken with decreasing volume and speed up over time.

A 2007 case study by Van Borsel et al. examined the acoustic features in palilalia. AB, a 60-year-old male was diagnosed with idiopathic Parkinson's disease and had noticed changes in gait, posture, writing, and speech. Observation of his perceptual speech characteristics and Frenchay Dysarthria Assessment results suggested AB suffered from hypokinetic dysarthria with a marked palilalia. It was determined to start speech therapy with passive (metronome) and active (pacing boards) pacing techniques to reduce the number of palilalic repetitions. However, AB was not able to enunciate despite extensive training.

Analysis of AB's speech therapy showed that his repetitions lasted from 1 minute 33 seconds to 2 minutes 28 seconds, ranging from 1 to 32 repetitions on some words, and differed from trial to trial. Pauses were present between each repetition, ranging from 0.1 to 0.7 seconds. Van Borsel et al. concluded that AB's palilalic repetitions followed no pattern: the duration of each repetition train did not decrease over time, the number of repetitions per train did not increase, and the duration of each individual word did not decrease in duration. Such results indicated not all palilalic repetitions show an increasing rate with decreasing volume, and defied the two distinct subtypes of palilalia as suggested by Sterling. Sterling's type A, sometimes called palilalie spasmodique, is characterized by fast repetitions and decreasing volume, while Sterling's type B, sometimes called palilalie atonique, is characterized by repetitions at a constant rate with interspersed periods of silence. AB showed neither a systematic increase (Sterling's type A) or a constant duration (Sterling's type B) and instead fell between the two.

Palilalia has been theorized to occur in writing and sign language. A case study by Tyrone and Moll examined a 79-year-old right-handed deaf man named PSP who showed anomalies in his signing. PSP had learned British Sign Language (BSL) at the age of seven and had developed left-sided weakness and dysphagia at age 77. PSP showed involuntary movements and repetitions in his signing. Tyrone and Moll reported his movements were palilalic in nature, as entire signs were repeated and the repetitional movements became smaller and smaller in amplitude.

== Causes ==
Palilalia also occurs in a variety of neurological disorders, occurring most commonly in Tourette syndrome, Alzheimer's disease, and progressive supranuclear palsy. Such degradation can occur in the substantia nigra where decreased dopamine production results in a loss of function. It can also occur in a variety of genetic disorders including fragile X syndrome, Prader–Willi syndrome, and autism.

== Diagnosis ==
Palilalia must be differentiated from other complex tic disorders (such as echolalia), stuttering, and logoclonia. In contrast to stuttering or logoclonia, palilalic repetitions tend to consist of complete sections of words or phrases, are often repeated many times, and the speaker has no difficulty initiating speech.
