= Stereotypy =

Repetitive mechanical repetition of speech or physical activities

A stereotypy (/ˈstɛri.əˌtaɪpi, ˈstɪər-, -i.oʊ-/, (Note: "stereotypy". Lexico UK English Dictionary. Oxford University Press. n.d. Archived 2020-03-22 at the Wayback Machine.) STERR-ee-ə-ty-pee, STEER-, -ee-oh-) is a repetitive or ritualistic movement, posture, or utterance. Stereotypies may be simple movements such as body rocking, or complex, such as self-caressing, crossing and uncrossing of legs, and marching in place. They are found especially in people with autism spectrum disorder and visually impaired children, and are also found in intellectual disabilities, tardive dyskinesia, and stereotypic movement disorder; however, they may also be encountered in neurotypical individuals. Studies have shown stereotypies to be associated with some types of schizophrenia. Frontotemporal dementia is also a common neurological cause of repetitive behaviors and stereotypies. A number of causes have been hypothesized for stereotypy, and several treatment options are available.

Stereotypy is sometimes called stimming in autism, under the hypothesis that it self-stimulates one or more senses.

Among people with frontotemporal lobar degeneration, more than half (60%) had stereotypies. The time to onset of stereotypies in people with frontotemporal lobar degeneration may be years (average 2.1 years).

== Distinction from tics ==
Like tics, stereotypies are patterned and periodic, and are aggravated by fatigue, stress, and anxiety. Unlike tics, stereotypies usually begin before the age of three, involve more of the body, are more rhythmic and less random, and are associated more with engrossment in another activity rather than premonitory urges. Examples of early tics are things like blinking and throat clearing, while arm flapping is a more common stereotypy. Stereotypies do not have the ever-changing, waxing and waning nature of tics, and can remain constant for years. Tics are usually suppressible for brief periods; in contrast, children rarely consciously attempt to control a stereotypy, although they can be distracted from one.

== Proposed causes ==
There are several possible explanations for stereotypy, and different stereotyped behaviors may have different explanations. A popular explanation is stimming, which hypothesizes that a particular stereotyped behavior has a function related to a sensory input. Other explanations include hypotheses that stereotypy discharges tension or expresses frustration, that it communicates a need for attention or reinforcement or sensory stimulation, or that it is learned or neuropathological or some combination of the two, or that it is normal behavior with no particular explanation needed.

== Associated terms ==
Punding is a term that was coined originally to describe complex prolonged, purposeless, and stereotyped behavior in chronic amphetamine users; it was later described in Parkinson's disease. Punding is a compulsion to perform repetitive mechanical tasks, such as sorting, collecting, or assembling and disassembling common items. Punding may occur in individuals with Parkinson's disease treated with dopaminergic agents such as L-DOPA.

Tweaking is a slang term for compulsive or repetitive behavior; it refers to someone exhibiting pronounced symptoms of methamphetamine or other drug use.

== In animals ==
Stereotypies also occur in non-human animals. It is considered an abnormal behavior and is sometimes seen in captive animals, particularly those held in small enclosures with little opportunity to engage in more normal behaviors. These behaviors may be maladaptive, involving self-injury or reduced reproductive success, and in laboratory animals can confound behavioral research. Examples of stereotyped behaviors include pacing, rocking, swimming in circles, excessive sleeping, self-mutilation (including feather picking and excessive grooming), and mouthing cage bars. Stereotypies are seen in many species, including primates, birds, and carnivores. Up to 40% of elephants in zoos display stereotyped behaviors. Stereotypies are well known in stabled horses, usually developing as a result of being confined, particularly with insufficient exercise. They are colloquially called stable vices. They present a management issue, not only leading to facility damage from chewing, kicking, and repetitive motion, but also lead to health consequences for the animal if not addressed.

Stereotyped behaviors are thought to be caused ultimately by artificial environments that do not allow animals to satisfy their normal behavioral needs. Rather than refer to the behavior as abnormal, it has been suggested that it be described as "behavior indicative of an abnormal environment." Stereotypies are correlated with altered behavioral response selection in the basal ganglia.

Stereotyped behavior can sometimes be reduced or eliminated by environmental enrichment, including larger and more stimulating enclosures, training, and introductions of stimuli (such as objects, sounds, or scents) to the animal's environment. The enrichment must be varied to remain effective for any length of time. Housing social animals with other members of their species is also helpful. But once the behavior is established, it is sometimes impossible to eliminate due to alterations in the brain.

== See also ==
- Tourette syndrome – Neurodevelopmental disorder involving tics
