= Palipraxia =

Neurological symptom

Palipraxia is a rare complex tic involving the involuntary repetition of one's own movements. It is associated with Tourette syndrome and may be associated with epilepsy.
