= Puts =

Puts may refer to:

== People with the surname ==
- Jesse Puts (born 1994), Dutch competitive swimmer
- Kevin Puts (born 1972), American composer

== Other uses ==
- puts(), a function in the C programming language
- Put option, a stock market instrument
  - Naked put
- People Under The Stairs, an American hip hop group
- Premonitory Urge for Tics Scale, a measurement to assess urges in tic disorders
- Presbyterian University and Theological Seminary

== See also ==
- Put (disambiguation)
- Putsch, a term for coup d'état
