= Sensory phenomena =

Bodily sensations and feelings

Sensory phenomena are general feelings, urges or bodily sensations. They are present in many conditions including autism, epilepsy, neuropathy, obsessive–compulsive disorder, pain conditions, tardive syndromes, and tic disorders.

== In tic disorders ==
Sensory phenomena are associated with Tourette syndrome and tic disorders, and defined as "uncomfortable feelings or sensations preceding tics that usually are relieved by the movement". The tics of Tourette's are temporarily suppressible and preceded by a premonitory urge which is similar to the need to sneeze or scratch an itch. Individuals describe the need to tic as the buildup of tension in a particular anatomical location, which they may consciously choose to release, or which is released involuntarily. The presence of sensory phenomena differentiates subjects with Tourette syndrome plus obsessive-compulsive disorder (OCD) from subjects with OCD alone, and may be an important measure for grouping patients along the OCD-Tourette's disorder spectrum.
