= Blindism =

Set of behaviors in visually impaired children

Blindisms, also known as restricted or repetitive behavior (RRB) in visually impaired children, and stereotyped behaviors in blind children are a set of stereotypies (stereotyped, habitual and characteristic movements) in visually impaired children. These appear most often in those who are congenitally blind. Frequent movements include body rocking, repetitive handling of objects, hand and finger movements, eye poking, pressing and rubbing. Causes are not well understood, and treatment outcomes tend to be highly variable but generally positive.

== Symptoms and presentation ==
RRBs in visually impaired children are categorised into mannerisms and motor stereotypes. Mannerisms include eye poking, pressing and rubbing, gazing at lights and staring. Motor stereotypes include repetitive head/body rocking, thumb sucking, jumping, swirling, and repetitive hand/finger movements.

Blindism behaviors overlap with stereotypies observed in autistic people, and as some diagnostic criteria of autism depend on vision, it is particularly difficult to diagnose autism among the visually impaired, often based on a subjective clinical impression.

Children displaying blindism behaviors may experience teasing or social isolation by other children. Additionally, in the case of eye pressing, poking and rubbing which are generally exclusive stereotypies to visually impaired children, the skin around the eye may discolor and become calloused, along with a risk of eye infection, keratoconus, and corneal scarring.

== Causes ==
The causes of RRBs in visually impaired children are not well understood. Two distinct theories for causes are that it is compensation for sensory and/or social deprivation, and that it is a regulatory function in response to overstimulation and/or anxiety. However, as of 2021 such theories do not have empirical support. The lack of visual sensory feedback in blind people is known to affect the calibration process for body movement. It is also suspected that reinforcement of behavior plays a role in the development of RRBs. There are a variety of other theories drawing from neuroscience.

== Treatment ==
Early intervention is often helpful in preventing children from displaying blindism behaviors. In most cases, a qualified teacher arranges an early education program to help develop accurate and effective use of the child's senses. The parents are often included in such programs alongside their visually impaired children.

Overall success rates for treatment ranges from 88.9% to 68.4% depending on risk factors. However, these results have questionable reliability due to the lack of recent treatment studies for RRBs in visually impaired children, and many such past studies using punishment as opposed to reinforcement which featured highly variable efficacy.

== Prevalence ==
Autism has a high co-occurrence rate with visual impairment. As of 2022, prevalence of blindisms is largely inconclusive, with estimates ranging from 2% to 50% in autistic people. The prevalence of autism in children with visual impairment ranges from 20% to 38%, with a risk factor including the presence of other neurological conditions.

== See also ==
- Repetitive behavior in autism
