= Tourette Syndrome Clinical Global Impression =

Psychological measure used to assess severity of tics

The Tourette Syndrome Clinical Global Impression (TS-CGI) is a psychological measure used to briefly assess severity of tics.
