= Management of Tourette syndrome =

Managing symptoms of Tourette syndrome

Tourette syndrome (abbreviated as Tourette's or TS) is an inherited neurodevelopmental disorder that begins in childhood or adolescence, characterized by the presence of motor and phonic tics. The management of Tourette syndrome has the goal of managing symptoms to achieve optimum functioning, rather than eliminating symptoms; not all persons with Tourette's require treatment, and there is no cure or universally effective medication. Explanation and reassurance alone are often sufficient treatment; education is an important part of any treatment plan.

Tourette syndrome patients may exhibit symptoms of other comorbid conditions along with their motor and phonic tics. Associated conditions include attention-deficit hyperactivity disorder (ADHD), obsessive-compulsive disorder (OCD), learning disabilities and sleep disorders. Patients who have ADHD along with Tourette's may also have problems with disruptive behaviors, overall functioning, and cognitive function. Co-occurring OCD can also be a source of impairment, necessitating treatment. Not all persons with tics will also have other conditions and not all persons with tics require treatment, but when comorbid disorders are present, they often require treatment.

== Management priority ==
Management of Tourette syndrome can be divided into treatment of tics, and treatment of co-occurring conditions, which, when present, are often a larger source of functional impairment than the tics themselves.

There is no cure for Tourette's. No one medication effectively treats all symptoms, most medications prescribed for tics have not been approved for that use, and no medication is without the risk of significant adverse effects. Treatment is focused on identifying the most troubling or impairing symptoms and helping the individual manage them. Because comorbid conditions are often a larger source of impairment than tics, they are a priority in treatment. The management of Tourette's is individualized and involves shared decision-making between the clinician, patient, family and caregivers.

Education, reassurance and psychobehavioral therapy are often sufficient for the majority of cases. In particular, psychoeducation targeting the patient and their family and surrounding community is a key management strategy. Watchful waiting "is an acceptable approach" for those who are not functionally impaired. Symptom management may include behavioral, psychological and pharmacological therapies. Pharmacological intervention is reserved for more severe symptoms, while psychotherapy or cognitive behavioral therapy (CBT) may ameliorate depression and social isolation, and improve family support. The decision to use behavioral or pharmacological treatment is "usually made after the educational and supportive interventions have been in place for a period of months, and it is clear that the tic symptoms are persistently severe and are themselves a source of impairment in terms of self-esteem, relationships with the family or peers, or school performance".

== Psychoeducation and social support ==
Knowledge, education and understanding are uppermost in management plans for tic disorders, and psychoeducation is the first step. A child's parents are typically the first to notice their tics; they may feel worried, imagine that they are somehow responsible, or feel burdened by misinformation about Tourette's. Before seeing a doctor, many parents research TS on the internet, or have seen media portrayals of severe cases. Parents may be overly concerned, and not realize that they, too, have tics, while the child may not be bothered by the tics. In some cases, neither the parents nor their child know they are ticcing; pointing out tics in this case will unnecessarily draw attention to them. In such a case, informing a parent who is unaware of their own tics can be disturbing, and they have a "right not to be informed". When their child receives a diagnosis of Tourette syndrome, both parent and child usually feel relieved, although the diagnosis can also cause distress for the parents as they confront a chronic condition that can be difficult to treat. They may also react with disbelief, denial, anger or resentment, or be exhausted and discouraged by previous encounters with medical professionals and the daily challenges faced by their child and family. Effectively educating parents about the diagnosis and providing social support can ease their anxiety. This support can also lower the chance that their child will be unnecessarily medicated or experience an exacerbation of tics due to their parents' emotional state. Psychoeducation that encourages a "matter-of-fact" attitude, and helps dispel misconceptions and stigma, is most effective when provided to parents.

People with Tourette's may suffer socially if their tics are viewed as "bizarre". If a child has disabling tics, or tics that interfere with social or academic functioning, supportive psychotherapy or school accommodations can be helpful. Even children with milder tics may be angry, depressed or have low self-esteem as a result of increased teasing, bullying, rejection by peers or social stigmatization, and this can lead to social withdrawal. Some children feel empowered by presenting a peer awareness program to their classmates. It can be helpful to educate teachers and school staff about typical tics, how they fluctuate during the day, how they impact the child, and how to distinguish tics from naughty behavior. By learning to identify tics, adults can refrain from asking or expecting a child to stop ticcing, because "tic suppression can be exhausting, unpleasant, and attention-demanding and can result in a subsequent rebound bout of tics". The presence of ADHD is associated with functional impairment, disruptive behavior, and tic severity. Strategies to help the child at school can be established; these include allowing the child to chew gum to help reduce vocal tics, to use a laptop instead of writing by hand, and to take breaks from the classroom when tics are high. Providing additional test time can also be helpful, as can using oral tests when needed.

Adults with TS may withdraw socially to avoid stigmatization and discrimination because of their tics. Depending on their country's healthcare system, they may receive social services or help from support groups.

== Behavioral ==
Behavioral therapies using habit reversal training (HRT) and exposure and response prevention (ERP) are first-line interventions, and have been shown to be effective. Because tics are somewhat suppressible, when people with TS are aware of the premonitory urge that precedes a tic, they can be trained to develop a response to the urge that competes with the tic.

Comprehensive behavioral intervention for tics (CBIT) is based on HRT, the best researched behavioral therapy for tics. CBIT has been shown with a high level of confidence to be more likely to lead to a reduction in tics than other behavioral therapies or psychoeducation. CBIT has some limitations. Children under ten may not understand the treatment, and people with severe tics or ADHD may not be able to suppress their tics or sustain the focus required to benefit from behavioral treatments. There is a lack of therapists trained in behavioral interventions, and finding practitioners outside of specialty clinics can be difficult. Costs may also limit accessibility. TS experts debate whether increasing a child's awareness of tics with HRT/CBIT (as opposed to ignoring tics) can lead to more tics later in life.

There is little evidence supporting massed negative practice in the management of tics.

In the UK, where there is a shortage of therapists trained to deliver behavioral treatments such that behavioral therapy is not available to most for whom it is recommended, the National Institute for Health and Care Research funded a study of behavioral therapy delivered online to individuals with moderate to severe tics and states that it might be effective in reducing tics and could help remedy the lack of professionals.

When disruptive behaviors related to comorbid conditions exist, anger control training and parent management training can be effective. CBT is a useful treatment when OCD is present. Relaxation techniques, such as exercise, yoga and meditation may be useful in relieving the stress that can aggravate tics. Beyond HRT, the majority of behavioral interventions for Tourette's (for example, relaxation training and biofeedback) have not been systematically evaluated and are not empirically supported.

== Medication ==
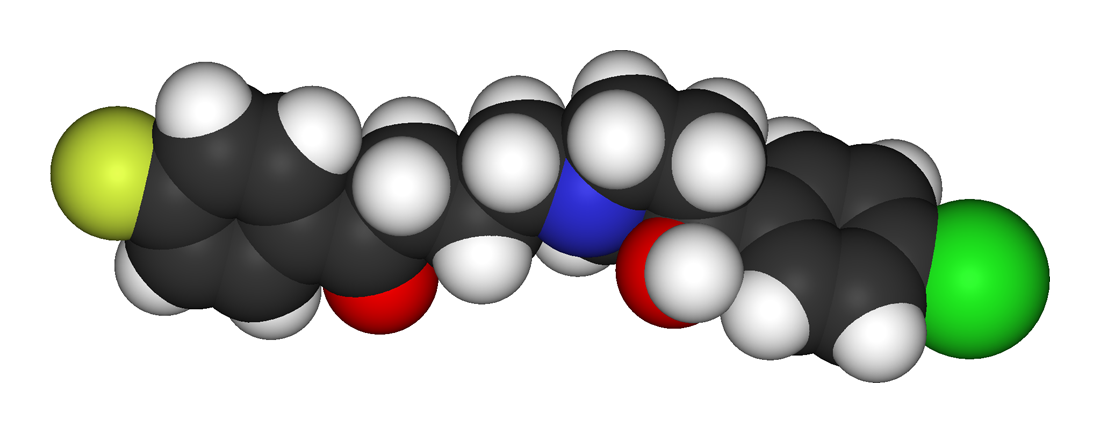
Space-filling representation of a haloperidol molecule. Haloperidol is an antipsychotic medication sometimes used to treat severe cases of Tourette's.

Children with tics typically present when their tics are most severe, but because the condition waxes and wanes, medication is not started immediately or changed often. Tics may subside with education, reassurance and a supportive environment. When medication is used, the goal is not to eliminate symptoms. Instead, the lowest dose that manages symptoms without adverse effects is used, because adverse effects may be more disturbing than the symptoms being treated with medication.

There are no medications specifically designed to target tics, although some antipsychotics (for example, pimozide) have been FDA-approved for treating Tourette's. Medications which are used as primary treatment in other conditions are used with some success in treating tics. Neuroleptic medications (antipsychotics), such as haloperidol (brand name Haldol) or pimozide (brand name Orap), have historically been and continue to be the medications with the most proven efficacy in controlling tics. These medications work by blocking dopamine receptors, and are associated with a high side effect profile. The traditional antipsychotic drugs are associated with tardive dyskinesia when used long-term; and parkinsonism, dystonia, dyskinesia, and akathisia when used short-term. Additional side effects can be school phobia (a form of separation anxiety), depression, weight gain, and cognitive blunting (dulling of cognitive ability). Another traditional antipsychotic used in treating Tourette's is fluphenazine (brand name Prolixin), although the evidence supporting its use is less than that of haloperidol and pimozide.

The classes of medication with proven efficacy in treating tics—typical and atypical neuroleptics—can have long-term and short-term adverse effects. The antihypertensive agents are also used to treat tics; studies show variable efficacy, but a lower side effect profile than the neuroleptics. There is moderate evidence that the antihypertensive clonidine, along with aripiprazole, haloperidol, risperidone, and tiapride, reduce tics more than placebo. Aripiprazole and risperidone are likely to lead to weight gain and sedation or fatigue; tiapride may produce sleep disturbances and tiredness; and clonidine may produce sedation. Risperidone and haloperidol may produce extrapyramidal symptoms, and increase prolactin levels. Because of lower side effects, aripiprazole is preferred over other antipsychotics.

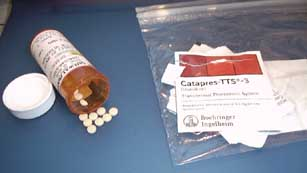
Clonidine (or the clonidine patch) is one of the medications typically tried first when medication is needed for Tourette's.

The α_{2}-adrenergic receptor agonists (antihypertensive agents) show some efficacy in reducing tics, as well as other comorbid features of some people with Tourette's. Originally developed to treat high blood pressure, these medications are a safer alternative to neuroleptic medications for the people with TS that respond to them. This class of medication is often the first tried for tics, as the antihypertensives have a lower side effect profile than some of the medications with more proven efficacy. The evidence for their safety and efficacy is not as strong as the evidence for some of the standard and atypical neuroleptics, but there is fair supportive evidence for their use, nonetheless. This class of medication takes about six weeks to begin to work on tics, so sustained trials are warranted. Because of the blood pressure effects, antihypertensive agents should not be discontinued suddenly. Clonidine (brand name Catapres) works on tics for about half of people with TS. Maximal benefit may not be achieved for 4–6 months. A small number of patients may worsen on clonidine. Guanfacine (brand name Tenex) is another antihypertensive that is used in treating TS. Side effects can include sedation, dry mouth, fatigue, headaches and dizziness. Sedation can be problematic when treatment is first initiated, but may wear off as the patient adjusts to the medication.

Other medications that can be used to treat tics include pergolide (brand name Permax), and with less empirical support for efficacy, tetrabenazine and baclofen.

There is low to very low confidence that tics are reduced with baclofen, deprenyl, flutamide, guanfacine, mecamylamine, metoclopramide, ondansetron, pimozide, pramipexole, riluzole, tetrahydrocannabinol, topiramate, or ziprasidone. There is insufficient evidence for other cannabis-based medications in the treatment of Tourette's.

Clomipramine, a tricyclic, and SSRIs—a class of antidepressants including fluoxetine, sertraline, and fluvoxamine—may be prescribed when a Tourette's patient also has symptoms of obsessive–compulsive disorder.

The benefits and harms of botulinum toxin for treating tics have not been established as of 2018.

== Treatment of ADHD in the presence of tic disorders ==
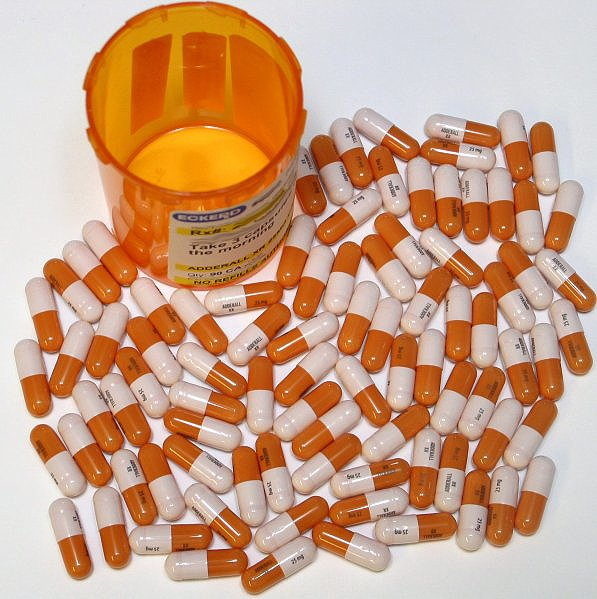
Stimulants (such as Adderall and Ritalin) are underused in the treatment of ADHD when tics are also present.

Patients with Tourette's who are referred to specialty clinics have a high rate of comorbid attention-deficit hyperactivity disorder (ADHD), so the treatment of ADHD co-occurring with tics is often part of the clinical treatment of Tourette's. Patients who have ADHD along with Tourette's may also have problems with disruptive behaviors, overall functioning, and cognitive function, accounted for by the comorbid ADHD, highlighting the importance of identifying and treating other conditions when present.

Stimulants and other medications may be useful in treating ADHD when it co-occurs with tic disorders. Drugs from several other classes of medications can be used when stimulants fail. There is moderate evidence supporting that clonidine combined with methylphenidate, desipramine, and methylphenidate alone reduce tics more than placebo when ADHD is also present; desipramine is rarely used following reports of sudden death in children. Atomoxetine does not increase tics, but may lead to weight loss and an increased heart rate.

The treatment of ADHD in the presence of tic disorders has long been a controversial topic. Past medical practice held that stimulants (such as Ritalin) could not be used in the presence of tics, due to concern that their use might worsen tics; however, multiple lines of research have shown that stimulants can be cautiously used in the presence of tic disorders.

Several studies have shown that stimulants do not exacerbate tics any more than placebo does, and suggest that stimulants may even reduce tic severity. Controversy remains, and the PDR continues to carry a warning that stimulants should not be used in the presence of tic disorders, so physicians may be reluctant to use them. Others are comfortable using them and even advocate for a stimulant trial when ADHD co-occurs with tics, because the symptoms of ADHD can be more impairing than tics.

The stimulants are the first line of treatment for ADHD, with proven efficacy, but they do fail in up to 20% of cases, even in patients without tic disorders. Current prescribed stimulant medications include: methylphenidate (brand names Ritalin, Metadate, Concerta), dextroamphetamine (Dexedrine), and mixed amphetamine salts (Adderall). Other medications can be used when stimulants are not an option. These include the alpha-2 agonists (clonidine and guanfacine). There is good empirical support for the use of desipramine, bupropion and atomoxetine (brand name Strattera). Atomoxetine is the only non-controlled Food and Drug Administration (FDA) approved drug for the treatment of ADHD, but is less effective than stimulants for ADHD, is associated with individual cases of liver damage, carries an FDA black box warning regarding suicidal ideation, and controlled studies show increases in heart rate, decreases of body weight, decreased appetite and treatment-emergent nausea.

== Other ==
Complementary and alternative medicine approaches, such as dietary modification, neurofeedback and allergy testing and control have popular appeal, but they have no proven benefit in the management of Tourette syndrome. Despite this lack of evidence, up to two-thirds of parents, caregivers and individuals with TS use dietary approaches and alternative treatments and do not always inform their physicians. According to Müller-Vahl (2013), medical professionals "should feel obliged to inform their patients about not only effective but also ineffective treatments". There is low confidence that tics are reduced with tetrahydrocannabinol, and insufficient evidence for other cannabis-based medications in the treatment of Tourette's.

While a balanced diet may aid in overall health, and avoidance of caffeine may help minimize tics for some children, no particular diet or alternative therapy (vitamin or diet) is supported by scientific evidence. Regular exercise can help reduce stress and improve a child's sense of accomplishment and self-esteem, but the effect of exercise on symptoms remains unstudied. There is no good evidence supporting the use of acupuncture or transcranial magnetic stimulation; neither is there evidence supporting intravenous immunoglobulin, plasma exchange, or antibiotics for the treatment of PANDAS.

Deep brain stimulation (DBS) has become a valid option for individuals with severe symptoms that do not respond to conventional therapy and management, although it is an experimental treatment. There is low-quality, limited evidence that DBS is safe, well tolerated, and yields a reduction of symptoms ranging from no change to complete remission. Selecting candidates who may benefit from DBS is challenging, and the appropriate lower age range for surgery is unclear; it is potentially useful in less than 3% of individuals. The ideal brain location to target has not been identified as of 2019. DBS has been used to treat adults with severe Tourette's that does not respond to conventional treatment. Viswanathan A et al (2012) say that DBS should be used in patients with "severe functional impairment that can not be managed medically".

== Pregnancy ==
A quarter of women report that their tics increase before menstruation, however studies have not shown consistent evidence of a change in frequency or severity of tics related to pregnancy. Overall, symptoms in women respond better to haloperidol than they do for men, and one report found that haloperidol was the preferred medication during pregnancy, to minimize the side effects in the mother, including low blood pressure, and anticholinergic effects. Most women find they can withdraw from medication during pregnancy without much trouble.

== Practice guidelines ==
In 2019, the American Academy of Neurology (AAN) published practice guidelines, "Treatment of tics in people with Tourette syndrome and chronic tic disorders", including 46 recommendations based on a systematic review by nine physicians, two psychologists, and two patient representatives. The panel assigned three levels of recommendations corresponding to the strength of the evidence supporting the recommendation:

- A: "rare because they are based on high confidence in the evidence and require both a high magnitude of benefit and low risk".
- B: "common because the requirements are less stringent but still based on the evidence and benefit–risk profile".
- C: "lowest allowable recommendation level that the AAN considers useful within the scope of clinical practice and accommodates the highest degree of practice variation".

The panel attached a helping verb to each level of recommendation: A = must; B = should, and C = may.

Description	Recommendation per American Academy of Neurology 2019 practice guidelines	Clinicians		
Description	Recommendation per American Academy of Neurology 2019 practice guidelines	A: Must	B: Should	C: May
Counseling	Inform individuals and caregivers about the natural course of tic disorders	check		
Counseling	Evaluate tic-related impairment in functioning	check		
Counseling	Inform about watchful waiting for those who do not experience impairment		check	
Counseling	Initially prescribe Comprehensive Behavioral Intervention for Tics (CBIT) for those who are motivated and without functional impairment			check
Counseling	Periodically re-evaluate need for any prescribed medications for tics	check		
Psychoeducation	Refer teachers and peers to resources for education about TS		check	
ADHD assessment and management	Assess for comorbid ADHD		check	
ADHD assessment and management	Evaluate impairment from symptoms of ADHD		check	
ADHD assessment and management	Ensure ADHD is treated when it is causing impairment		check	
OCD assessment and management	Assess for comorbid OCD		check	
OCD assessment and management	Ensure OCD is treated when it is present		check	
Other comorbid disorders	Screen for comorbid anxiety, mood, and disruptive behavior disorders	check		
Other comorbid disorders	Inquire about suicidal ideation and recommend resources if present	check		
Tic severity assessment	Measure severity of tics using a validated assessment scale			check
Treatment expectations	Inform that treating tics rarely leads to complete cessation of tics	check		
Behavioral treatments	For those who have access to it, prescribe CBIT initially relative to other behavioral interventions		check	
Behavioral treatments	Offer CBIT initially relative to medication		check	
Behavioral treatments	If face-to-face CBIT is not available, prescribe CBIT via Internet, or prescribe other behavioral interventions			check
α agonist treatment	Inform individuals with comorbid ADHD that α2 agonists may treat both tics and ADHD		check	
α agonist treatment	Prescribe α2 agonists when benefits outweigh risks		check	
α agonist treatment	Inform individuals treated about side effects of α2 agonists	check		
α agonist treatment	In those treated with α2 agonists, monitor heart rate and blood pressure	check		
α agonist treatment	For those taking extended release guanfacine, monitor QTc interval as indicated	check		
α agonist treatment	Gradually taper α2 agonists when discontinuing them	check		
Antipsychotic treatment	Prescribe antipsychotics when benefit outweighs risks			check
Antipsychotic treatment	Inform patients about adverse effects (extrapyramidal, hormonal, and metabolic) of antipsychotics	check		
Antipsychotic treatment	Prescribe lowest effective dosage of antipsychotics when using them	check		
Antipsychotic treatment	When using antipsychotics, use evidence-based monitoring for drug-induced movement disorders and adverse effects		check	
Antipsychotic treatment	When prescribing certain antipsychotics, monitor QTc interval and perform elecrocardiography	check		
Antipsychotic treatment	Gradually taper (over weeks to months) antipsychotics when discontinuing		check	
Botulinum toxin injections	Prescribe botulinum toxin injections for localized simple motor tics to adolescents and adults when benefits outweigh risks			check
Botulinum toxin injections	Prescribe botulinum toxin injections for aggressive or disabling vocal tics to adolescents and adults when benefits outweigh risks			check
Botulinum toxin injections	Inform individuals that temporary effects of botulinum toxin injections of hypophonia and weakness may occur	check		
Topiramate treatment	Prescribe topiramate when benefits outweigh risks		check	
Topiramate treatment	Inform individuals when prescribing topiramate of adverse effects	check		
Cannabis-based treatment	When individuals are using cannabis as self-medication for tics, direct them to appropriate medical supervision	check		
Cannabis-based treatment	For "treatment-resistant adults with clinically relevant tics", consider cannabis-based products where legislation permits it.			check
Cannabis-based treatment	For adults who already self-medicate tics with cannabis-based products, consider cannabis-based medication where legislation permits it.			check
Cannabis-based treatment	When prescribing cannabis-products where legislation permits it, use lowest effective dose	check		
Cannabis-based treatment	When prescribing, inform individuals that cannabis-based products can affect driving	check		
Cannabis-based treatment	When prescribing, provide ongoing re-evaluation of need	check		
Deep brain stimulation treatment	Employ multidisciplinary evaluation of benefits versus risks	check		
Deep brain stimulation treatment	Exclude secondary causes of tic-like movements and confirm TS diagnosis when considering deep brain stimulation		check	
Deep brain stimulation treatment	Screen for psychiatric disorders and follow deep brain stimulation subjects post-operatively	check		
Deep brain stimulation treatment	Before prescribing, assure that multiple classes of medications have been tried	check		
Deep brain stimulation treatment	Consider deep brain stimulation for "severe, self-injurious tics"			check

== See also ==
- List of investigational Tourette's syndrome drugs
