= Shapiro TS Severity Scale =

Psychological measurement

The Shapiro TS Severity Scale (STSS) is a psychological measure used to briefly assess severity of tics. The STSS is easier to administer than other recommended scales, but does not measure frequency, complexity, or distribution of tics.
