= Yale Global Tic Severity Scale =

Psychological measurement

- Purpose: assess tics

The Yale Global Tic Severity Scale (YGTSS) is a psychological measure designed to assess the severity and frequency of symptoms of disorders such as tic disorder, Tourette syndrome, and obsessive-compulsive disorder, in children and adolescents between ages 6 and 17.

The questionnaire is divided into three parts over the span of 17 pages: one section identifies symptoms of motor and phonic tics, severity, and age of onset. Another section concerns OCD symptoms, severity, and age of onset, and the last section concerns environmental effects on symptoms. The YGTSS is completed by the parent and takes approximately 15–20 minutes. The questionnaire has shown good reliability and validity in assessing tic severity in recent studies.
