= Motor tic, Obsessions and compulsions, Vocal tic Evaluation Survey =

Assessment for tics

The Motor tic, Obsessions and compulsions, Vocal tic Evaluation Survey (MOVES) is a psychological measure used to screen for tics and other behaviors. It measures "motor tics, vocal tics, obsessions, compulsions, and associated symptoms including echolalia, echopraxia, coprolalia, and copropraxia".
