= Motor disorder =

Disorder causing abnormal and involuntary movements

- Specialty: Neurology

Motor disorders are disorders of the nervous system that cause abnormal and involuntary movements. They can result from damage to the motor system. Motor disorders are distinct from movement disorders.

Motor disorders are defined in the fifth edition of the Diagnostic and Statistical Manual of Mental Disorders (DSM-5) – published in 2013 to replace the fourth text revision (DSM-IV-TR) – as a new sub-category of neurodevelopmental disorders. The DSM-5 motor disorders include developmental coordination disorder (dyspraxia), stereotypic movement disorder, and tic disorders including Tourette syndrome.

== Signs and symptoms ==
Motor disorders are malfunctions of the nervous system that cause involuntary or uncontrollable movements or actions of the body. These disorders can cause lack of intended movement or an excess of involuntary movement. Symptoms of motor disorders include tremors, jerks, twitches, spasms, contractions, or gait problems.

Tremor is the uncontrollable shaking of an arm or a leg. Twitches or jerks of body parts may occur due to a startling sound or unexpected, sudden pain. Spasms and contractions are temporary abnormal resting positions of hands or feet. Spasms are temporary while contractions could be permanent. Gait problems are problems with the way one walks or runs. This can mean an unsteady pace or dragging of the feet along with other possible irregularities.

Through the process of several healthcare professionals can help in diagnosing motor disorders. Neurological examinations can be made to identify motor disorders. This can be done through MRI or CT or electromyography, which are tests done to evaluate the function of muscles and nerves.

== Causes ==
Pathological changes of certain areas of the brain are the main causes of most motor disorders. Causes of motor disorders by genetic mutation usually affect the cerebrum. The way humans move requires many parts of the brain to work together to perform a complex process. The brain must send signals to the muscles instructing them to perform a certain action. There are constant signals being sent to and from the brain and the muscles that regulate the details of the movement such as speed and direction, so when a certain part of the brain malfunctions, the signals can be incorrect or uncontrollable causing involuntary or uncontrollable actions or movements.

== Risk factors ==
The irregularity of body movements, such as tremors and jerking movements in the hands, arms, legs, and the head, including the face, can cause issues with coordination and balance. Issues with coordination and balance may cause stability problems that can lead to falls and injuries. Movement disorders can cause a decrease in pace within the body which can be exhausting and much harder for individuals to get by in their daily living.
