= Henrik Anckarsäter =

Swedish psychologist (1966–2021)

Henrik Anckarsäter (12 October 1966 - 9 March 2021) was born in Gothenburg, Sweden, as Pär Henrik Georg Söderström, was Professor of Forensic Psychiatry and co-founder of the Centre for Ethics, Law and Mental Health at the University of Gothenburg, and a consulting psychiatrist at the Sahlgrenska University Hospital. He has been guest professor at the Université Paris XII, France, and Lund University, Sweden, and board director of the International Academy of Law and Mental Health and on the board of the Society for Evidence-Based Gender Medicine. His research focus included child neuropsychiatry, including autism spectrum conditions, and the development of personality and identity in young adult years. He published nearly 200 papers in international peer-reviewed journals.
