= Premonitory urge =

Tic disorder sensory phenomenon

A premonitory urge is a sensory phenomenon associated with Tourette syndrome and other tic disorders. Premonitory urges are "uncomfortable feelings or sensations preceding tics that usually are relieved by [a particular] movement".

"Individuals with tics may have either a generalized or a localized sensation of tension that is relieved by movement, [that is] the tic." Sensory phenomena in tic disorders include bodily sensations, mental urges, and a sense of inner tension, feelings of incompleteness, and a need for things to be "just right". Bodily sensations include focal or generalized body sensations (usually tactile, muscular-skeletal/visceral, or both); mental sensations include urge only, energy release (mental energy that builds up and needs to be discharged), incompleteness, and just-right perceptions. Published descriptions of the tics of Tourette's identify sensory phenomena as the core symptom of Tourette syndrome, even though they are not included in the diagnostic criteria.

In contrast to the stereotyped movements of other movement disorders such as choreas, dystonias, myoclonus, and dyskinesias, the tics of Tourette's are temporarily suppressible and preceded by this premonitory urge. Immediately preceding tic onset, most individuals with Tourette syndrome are aware of an urge, which is similar to the need to sneeze or scratch an itch. Individuals describe the need to tic as the buildup of tension in a particular anatomical location, which they consciously choose to release, as if the subject "had to do it". Examples of the premonitory urge are the feeling of having something in one's throat, or a localized discomfort in the shoulders, leading to the need to clear one's throat or shrug the shoulders. The actual tic may be felt as relieving this tension or sensation, similar to scratching an itch. Another example is blinking to relieve an uncomfortable sensation in the eye.

The presence of sensory phenomena differentiates subjects with Tourette syndrome plus obsessive–compulsive disorder (OCD) from subjects with OCD alone, and may be an important measure for grouping patients along the OCD-Tourette's disorder spectrum.
