= Neurodevelopmental disorder =

Set of disorders affecting development of nervous system

- Sheikh Hasina delivering a speech at the 2017 International Conference on Autism and Neuro Developmental Disorders.
- Specialty: Psychiatry, neurology
- Symptoms: Impaired in personal, social, academic domains
- Usual onset: Early childhood (typically before school age)
- Types: Intellectual disability; Communication disorder; Autism; Attention deficit hyperactivity disorder; Motor disorder; Learning disorder
- Diagnostic method: Based on symptom, genetic testing
- Treatment: Early intervention, therapy, educational support

Neurodevelopmental disorders (NDDs) are a diverse group of complex psychiatric conditions caused by the abnormal, or disrupted development of the brain, or by injury or infection during early childhood. These conditions generally appear in early childhood, usually pre-school age, and can persist into adulthood. NDDs are different from neurocognitive disorders that are acquired and not developmental.

Neurodevelopmental disorders are categorized in the Diagnostic and Statistical Manual of Mental Disorders, Fifth Edition (DSM-5) into six groups: intellectual disabilities, communication disorders, autism spectrum disorder, attention deficit hyperactivity disorder, motor disorders, and specific learning disorders. The international classification of diseases ICD-11 published by the World Health Organization (WHO), includes NDDs in the general heading of Mental, behavioral or neurodevelopmental disorders, and lists them in seven groupings. A factsheet on Mental disorders (2025) published by WHO states that there are many types of mental disorder and lists NDDs as one. It describes a mental disorder, also called a mental health condition as a noted impairment in cognition, emotional or behavioral regulation.

More than one NDD may be present, giving overlapping symptoms, and are often complicated by the co-occurrence of other conditions. For instance a tic disorder, a type of motor disorder, may also be comorbid with a movement disorder, another mental disorder, or a substance use disorder.

Some NDDs such as Down syndrome have a genetic cause. Other possible causes include environmental factors such as prenatal stress, early developmental stress, and fetal exposure to toxicants; pollution, infections, and traumatic brain injury.

NDDs are diverse with treatments targeted at the disorder that may include medications and other interventional therapies.

== Classification ==
Neurodevelopment disorders (NDDs) are diverse and complex behavioral and cognitive conditions. Neurodevelopment itself is a wide-ranging process prone to abnormalities that may be responsible for the early presentation of the intellectual and functional impairments of the NDDs. Symptoms of an NDD may often overlap with another condition (including another NDD) making diagnosis and appropriate treatment a challenge. The six groups of disorders categorized by DSM5 are intellectual disability, communication disorder, autism, attention deficit hyperactivity disorder, motor disorders, and specific learning disorders.

=== Intellectual disability ===
Number of people with developmental intellectual disability by sex

Intellectual disability, also disorder of intellectual development, and known as learning difficulty (in the United Kingdom and different from learning disability), formerly mental retardation, is a neurodevelopmental disorder characterized by significant impairment in intellectual and adaptive functioning. The level of impairment may be mild, moderate, severe or profound. Causes may be either developmental or genetic. Children with intellectual disability typically have an intelligence quotient (IQ) below 70 and deficits in at least two adaptive behaviors that affect everyday living.

=== Communication disorders ===
A communication disorder is any disorder that affects an individual's ability to comprehend, detect, or apply language and speech to engage in dialogue effectively with others. This also encompasses deficiencies in verbal and non-verbal communication styles. The delays and disorders can range from simple sound substitution to the inability to understand or use one's native language.

=== Autism spectrum disorder ===
Autism, also known as autism spectrum disorder (ASD), is a condition characterized by impairment in social communication and interaction, as well as a need or strong preference for predictability and routine, sensory processing differences, focused interests, or repetitive behaviors. Features of autism are present from early childhood and the condition typically persists throughout life. Autism is classified as a neurodevelopmental disorder, and a diagnosis requires professional assessment that these characteristics cause significant challenges in daily life beyond what is expected given a person's age and social environment. Because autism is a spectrum disorder, presentations vary and support needs range from minimal assistance to full-time, 24-hour care.

==== Symptoms ====
The symptoms have a wide range of severity. The symptoms of ASD can be broadly categorised as the following:

===== Persistent issues in social interactions and communications =====
These are predominantly seen by unresponsiveness in conversations, lesser emotional sharing, inability to initiate conversations, inability to interpret body language, avoidance of eye-contact and difficulty maintaining relationships.

===== Repetitive behavioral patterns =====
These patterns can be seen in the form of repeated movements of the hand or the phrases used while talking. A rigid adherence to schedules and inflexibility to adapt even if a minor change is made to their routine is also one of the behavioral symptoms of ASD. They could also display sensory patterns such as extreme aversion to certain odors or indifference to pain or temperature.

There are also different symptoms at different ages based on developmental milestones. Children between 0 and 36 months with ASD show a lack of eye contact, seem to be deaf, lack a social smile, do not like being touched or held, have unusual sensory behavior and show a lack of imitation. Children between 12 and 24 months with ASD show a lack of gestures, prefer to be alone, do not point to objects to indicate interest, are easily frustrated with challenges, and lack of functional play. And finally children between the ages of 24 and 36 months with ASD show a lack of symbolic play and an unusual interest in certain objects, or moving objects.

==== Treatment ====
There is no specific treatment for autism spectrum disorders, but there are several types of therapy effective in easing the symptoms of autism, such as Applied Behavior Analysis (ABA), Speech-language therapy, Occupational therapy or Sensory integration therapy.

Applied behavioral analysis (ABA) is considered the most effective therapy for Autism spectrum disorders by the American Academy of Pediatrics. ABA focuses on teaching adaptive behaviors like social skills, play skills, or communication skills and diminishing problematic behaviors like self-injury. This is done by creating a specialized plan that uses behavioral therapy techniques, such as positive or negative reinforcement, to encourage or discourage certain behaviors over-time.

Occupational therapy helps autistic children and adults learn everyday skills that help them with daily tasks, such as personal hygiene and movement. These skills are then integrated into their home, school, and work environments. Therapists will oftentimes help patients learn to adapt their environment to their skill level. This type of therapy could help autistic people become more engaged in their environment. An occupational therapist will create a plan based on the patient's needs and desires and work with them to achieve their set goals.

Speech-language therapy can help those with autism who need to develop or improve communication skills. According to the organization Autism Speaks, “speech-language therapy is designed to coordinate the mechanics of speech with the meaning and social use of speech”. People with low-functioning autism may not be able to communicate with spoken words. Speech-language Pathologists (SLP) may teach someone how to communicate more effectively with others or work on starting to develop speech patterns. The SLP will create a plan that focuses on what the child needs.

Sensory integration therapy helps people with autism adapt to different kinds of sensory stimuli. Many children with autism can be oversensitive to certain stimuli, such as lights or sounds, causing them to overreact. Others may not react to certain stimuli, such as someone speaking to them. Many types of therapy activities involve a form of play, such as using swings, toys and trampolines to help engage the patients with sensory stimuli. Therapists will create a plan that focuses on the type of stimulation the person needs integration with.

=== Attention deficit hyperactivity disorder ===
Attention deficit hyperactivity disorder (ADHD) is a neurodevelopmental disorder characterized by executive dysfunction occasioning symptoms of inattention, hyperactivity, impulsivity and emotional dysregulation that are excessive and pervasive, impairing in multiple contexts, and developmentally-inappropriate. There are three subtypes of ADHD: predominantly inattentive, predominantly hyperactive, and combined (which presents as both hyperactive and inattentive subtypes). ADHD is twice as common in boys than girls but it is seen that the hyperactive/impulsive type is more common in boys while the inattentive type affects both sexes equally.

ADHD symptoms arise from executive dysfunction, and emotional dysregulation is often considered a core symptom. Difficulties in self-regulation such as time management, inhibition and sustained attention may cause poor professional performance, relationship difficulties and numerous health risks, collectively predisposing to a diminished quality of life and a direct average reduction in life expectancy of 13 years. ADHD is associated with other neurodevelopmental and mental disorders as well as non-psychiatric disorders, which can cause additional impairment.

==== Symptoms ====
Symptoms of ADHD include inattentiveness, impulsiveness, and hyperactivity. Many of the behaviors that are associated with ADHD include poor control over actions resulting in disruptive behavior and academic problems. Another area that is affected by these disorders is the social arena for the person with the disorder. Many children that have this disorder exhibit poor interpersonal relationships and struggle to fit in socially with their peers. Behavioral study of these children can show a history of other symptoms such as temper tantrums, mood swings, sleep disturbances and aggressiveness.

=== Motor disorders ===
Motor disorders are neurodevelopmental disorders that cause abnormal and involuntary movements. They can result from damage to the motor system. They were redefined in DSM-5. Motor disorders include developmental coordination disorder, stereotypic movement disorder, and tic disorders including Tourette syndrome. Motor disorders are distinct from movement disorders.

==== Developmental coordination disorder ====
Developmental coordination disorder is an impaired coordination that results from impaired motor planning.

==== Stereotypic movement disorder ====
Stereotypic movement disorder displays restrictive or repetitive movements such as hand waving or head banging that are prolonged and intense causing significant impairment.

=== Specific learning disorders ===
Deficits in any area of information processing can manifest in a variety of specific learning disabilities (SLD). It is possible for an individual to have more than one of these difficulties. This is referred to as comorbidity or co-occurrence of learning disabilities.

==== Nonverbal learning disorder ====
Nonverbal learning disorder is a suggested syndrome as a subtype of specific learning disorder. Nonverbal learning disorder involves an impairment in visuospatial abilities making it difficult to process nonverbal information such as presented in maths. This proposed subtype also implicates an impaired sense of touch. Whilst it has been recognised for many years it is not an official diagnosis. A proposed reframing to Developmental visual-spatial disorder is hoped to be accepted as a disorder in the DSM.

=== Other disorders ===
- Learning disabilities, such as Dysgraphia
- Communication disorders and Auditory processing disorder
- Developmental coordination disorder
- Genetic disorders, such as Down syndrome or Williams syndrome
- Tic disorders such as Tourette syndrome
- Stuttering
- Intellectual disability

== Emergence ==
Learning disabilities are often diagnosed when the children are young and just beginning school. Most learning disabilities are found under the age of 9.

Young children with communication disorders may not speak at all, or may have a limited vocabulary for their age. Some children with communication disorders have difficulty understanding simple directions or cannot name objects. Most children with communication disorders can speak by the time they enter school, however, they continue to have problems with communication. School-aged children often have problems understanding and formulating words. Teens may have more difficulty with understanding or expressing abstract ideas.

== Causes ==
The scientific study of the causes of developmental disorders involves many theories. Some of the major differences between these theories involves whether environment disrupts normal development, if abnormalities are pre-determined, or if they are products of human evolutionary history which become disorders in modern environments (see evolutionary psychiatry). Normal development occurs with a combination of contributions from both the environment and genetics. The theories vary in the part each factor has to play in normal development, thus affecting how the abnormalities are caused.

The development of the nervous system (neurodevelopment) is tightly regulated and timed. It is influenced by genetics, the prenatal and perinatal environment, and environmental factors associated with early childhood. Any significant deviation from normal development can result in missing or abnormal neuronal architecture and connectivity.

Neuronal development for example is a rapid process that continues into early childhood with over a million neural connections being made every second. A disruption at any brief time in this process can adversely affect different regions of the growing brain. The synthesis of cholesterol is critical for this development as it is a major cellular component of the myelin that surrounds each axon. Cholesterol is needed to regulate protein signaling as a major organizer of lipid rafts and its dysfunction can have far reaching and long term consequences. Lipid rafts are critical for signal transduction. L1 is a cell adhesion molecule that promotes the growth of axons and dendrites and is dependent on the formation of lipid rafts.

Potential causes of disruption range from social deprivation, genetic and metabolic diseases, immune disorders, infections, poor nutrition, physical trauma, and toxicants. Some neurodevelopmental disorders, such as autism, are considered multifactorial syndromes which have many causes that converge to a more specific neurodevelopmental manifestation. Some deficits may be predicted from observed deviations in the maturation patterns of the infant gut microbiome.

=== Social ===
Deprivation from social and emotional care causes severe delays in brain and cognitive development. Studies with children growing up in Romanian orphanages during Nicolae Ceauşescu's regime reveal profound effects of social deprivation and language deprivation on the developing brain. These effects are time-dependent. The longer children stayed in negligent institutional care, the greater the consequences. By contrast, adoption at an early age mitigated some of the effects of earlier institutionalization.

=== Genetics ===
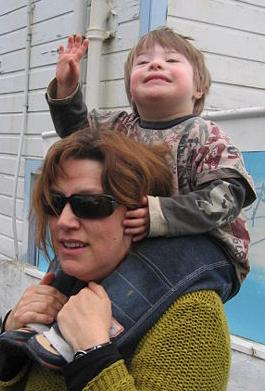
A child with Down syndrome

A prominent example of a genetically determined neurodevelopmental disorder is trisomy 21, also known as Down syndrome. This disorder usually results from an extra chromosome 21, although in uncommon instances it is related to other chromosomal abnormalities such as translocation of the genetic material. It is characterized by short stature, epicanthal (eyelid) folds, abnormal fingerprints and palm prints, heart defects, poor muscle tone (delay of neurological development), and intellectual disabilities (delay of intellectual development).

Less commonly known genetically determined neurodevelopmental disorders include fragile X syndrome. Fragile X syndrome was first described in 1943 by Martin and Bell, studying persons with family history of sex-linked "mental defects". Rett syndrome, another X-linked disorder, produces severe functional limitations. Williams syndrome is caused by small deletions of genetic material from chromosome 7. The most common recurrent copy number variation disorder is DiGeorge syndrome (22q11.2 deletion syndrome), followed by Prader–Willi syndrome and Angelman syndrome.

==== Immune dysfunction ====
Immune reactions during pregnancy, both maternal and of the developing child, may produce neurodevelopmental disorders. One typical immune reaction in infants and children is PANDAS, or Pediatric Autoimmune Neuropsychiatric Disorders Associated with Streptococcal infection. Another disorder is Sydenham's chorea, which results in more abnormal movements of the body and fewer psychological sequelae. Both are immune reactions against brain tissue that follow infection by Streptococcus bacteria. Susceptibility to these immune diseases may be genetically determined, so sometimes several family members may have one or both of them following an epidemic of Strep infection.

=== Infectious ===
Systemic infections can result in neurodevelopmental consequences, when they occur in infancy and childhood, but would not be called a primary neurodevelopmental disorder. For example HIV infections of the head and brain, like brain abscesses, meningitis or encephalitis have a high risk of causing neurodevelopmental problems and eventually a disorder. For example, measles can progress to subacute sclerosing panencephalitis.

A number of infectious diseases can be transmitted congenitally (either before or at birth), and can cause serious neurodevelopmental problems, as for example the viruses HSV, CMV, rubella (congenital rubella syndrome), Zika virus, or bacteria like Treponema pallidum in congenital syphilis, which may progress to neurosyphilis if it remains untreated. Protozoa like Plasmodium or Toxoplasma which can cause congenital toxoplasmosis with multiple cysts in the brain and other organs, leading to a variety of neurological deficits.

==== Metabolic disorders ====
Metabolic disorders in either the mother or the child can cause neurodevelopmental disorders. Two examples are diabetes mellitus (a multifactorial disorder) and phenylketonuria (an inborn error of metabolism). Many such inherited diseases may directly affect the child's metabolism and neural development but less commonly they can indirectly affect the child during gestation. (See also teratology).

In a child, type 1 diabetes can produce neurodevelopmental damage by the effects of excess or insufficient glucose. The problems continue and may worsen throughout childhood if the diabetes is not well controlled. Type 2 diabetes may be preceded in its onset by impaired cognitive functioning.

A non-diabetic fetus can also be subjected to glucose effects if its mother has undetected gestational diabetes. Maternal diabetes causes excessive birth size, making it harder for the infant to pass through the birth canal without injury or it can directly produce early neurodevelopmental deficits. Usually the neurodevelopmental symptoms will decrease in later childhood.

Phenylketonuria, also known as PKU, can induce neurodevelopmental problems and children with PKU require a strict diet to prevent intellectual disability and other disorders. In the maternal form of PKU, excessive maternal phenylalanine can be absorbed by the fetus even if the fetus has not inherited the disease. This can produce intellectual disability and other disorders.

=== Nutrition ===
Nutrition disorders and nutritional deficits may cause neurodevelopmental disorders, such as spina bifida, and the rarely occurring anencephaly, both of which are neural tube defects with malformation and dysfunction of the nervous system and its supporting structures, leading to serious physical disability and emotional sequelae. The most common nutritional cause of neural tube defects is folic acid deficiency in the mother, a B vitamin usually found in fruits, vegetables, whole grains, and milk products. (Neural tube defects are also caused by medications and other environmental causes, many of which interfere with folate metabolism, thus they are considered to have multifactorial causes.) Another deficiency, iodine deficiency, produces a spectrum of neurodevelopmental disorders ranging from mild emotional disturbance to severe intellectual disability. (see also congenital iodine deficiency syndrome).

=== Toxins ===
Different toxicants can adversely affect fetal development. Alcohol consumption for example can cause fetal alcohol syndrome associated with developmental delay.

=== Physical trauma ===
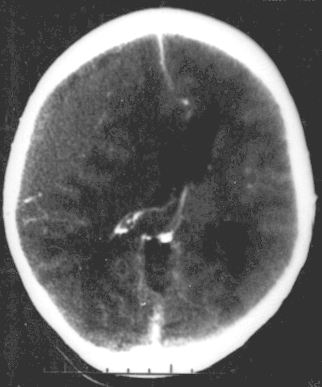
CT scan showing epidural hematoma, a type of traumatic brain injury (upper left)

Brain trauma in the developing human is a common cause of neurodevelopmental syndromes. It may be subdivided into two major categories, congenital injury (including injury resulting from otherwise uncomplicated premature birth) and injury occurring in infancy or childhood. Common causes of congenital injury are asphyxia (obstruction of the trachea), hypoxia (lack of oxygen to the brain), and the mechanical trauma of the birth process itself.

=== Placenta ===
A growing number of studies are linking the placenta to fetal brain development.

== Diagnosis ==
Neurodevelopmental disorders are diagnosed by evaluating the presence of characteristic symptoms or behaviors in a child, typically after a parent, guardian, teacher, or other responsible adult has raised concerns to a doctor.

Neurodevelopmental disorders may also be confirmed by genetic testing. Traditionally, disease related genetic and genomic factors are detected by karyotype analysis, which detects clinically significant genetic abnormalities for 5% of children with a diagnosed disorder. As of 2017, chromosomal microarray analysis (CMA) was proposed to replace karyotyping because of its ability to detect smaller chromosome abnormalities and copy-number variants, leading to greater diagnostic yield in about 20% of cases. The American College of Medical Genetics and Genomics and the American Academy of Pediatrics recommend CMA as standard of care in the US.

== Management ==
NDDs are diverse with treatments targeted at the disorder. Effective treatments include psychosocial and behavioral interventions, and occupational and speech therapy. Medications are an option for certain diagnoses.

== See also ==
- Developmental disability
- Epigenetics
- Microcephaly
- SCN2A-Related Disorders (epilepsy and autism)
- Teratology
- TRPM3-related neurodevelopmental disorder
- Channelopathies
- DHX30 syndrome
