= Tic =

Sudden movement or vocalization

- Examples of motor tics
- Specialty: Psychiatry, neurology

A tic is a sudden and repetitive motor movement or vocalization that is not rhythmic and involves discrete muscle groups. Tics are typically brief and may resemble a normal behavioral characteristic or gesture.

Tics can be invisible to the observer, such as abdominal tensing or toe crunching. Common motor and phonic tics are, respectively, eye blinking and throat clearing.

Tics must be distinguished from movement disorders such as chorea, dystonia and myoclonus; the compulsions of obsessive–compulsive disorder (OCD) and seizure activity; and movements exhibited in stereotypic movement disorder (stimming).

== Classification ==
Tics are classified as either motor or phonic, and simple or complex.

=== Motor or phonic ===
Motor tics are movement-based tics affecting discrete muscle groups.

Phonic tics are involuntary sounds produced by moving air through the nose, mouth, or throat. They may be alternately referred to as verbal tics or vocal tics, but most diagnosticians prefer the term phonic tics to reflect the notion that the vocal cords are not involved in all tics that produce sound.

=== Simple or complex ===
Simple motor tics are typically sudden, brief, meaningless movements that usually involve only one group of muscles, such as eye blinking, head jerking, or shoulder shrugging. Motor tics can be of an endless variety and may include such movements as hand clapping, neck stretching, mouth movements, head, arm or leg jerks, and facial grimacing.

A simple phonic tic can be almost any sound or noise, with common phonic tics being throat clearing, sniffing, or grunting.

Complex motor tics are typically more purposeful-appearing and of a longer nature. They may involve a cluster of movements and appear coordinated. Examples of complex motor tics are pulling at clothes, touching people, touching objects, echopraxia (repeating or imitating another person's actions) and copropraxia (involuntarily performing obscene or forbidden gestures).

Complex phonic tics include echolalia (repeating words just spoken by someone else), palilalia (repeating one's own previously spoken words), lexilalia (repeating words after reading them), and coprolalia (the spontaneous utterance of socially objectionable or taboo words or phrases). Coprolalia is a highly publicized symptom of Tourette syndrome; however, only about 10% of TS patients exhibit coprolalia.

Martino, et al. have argued that tics may be considered physiological, or developmentally typical.

== Characteristics ==
Tics are described as semi-voluntary or unvoluntary, because they are not strictly involuntary—they may be experienced as a voluntary response to a premonitory urge (a sensory phenomenon that is an inner sensation of mounting tension). A unique aspect of tics, relative to other movement disorders, is that they are suppressible yet irresistible; they are experienced as an irresistible urge that must eventually be expressed.

Tics may increase as a result of stress, fatigue, boredom, or high-energy emotions, which can include negative emotions, such as anxiety, as well as positive emotions, such as excitement or anticipation. Relaxation may result in a tic increase (for instance, watching television or using a computer), while concentration on an absorbing activity often leads to a decrease in tics. Neurologist and writer Oliver Sacks described a physician with severe Tourette syndrome (Canadian Mort Doran, M.D., a pilot and surgeon in real life, although a pseudonym was used in the book), whose tics remitted almost completely while he was performing surgery.

Immediately preceding tic onset, most individuals are aware of an urge that is similar to the need to yawn, sneeze, blink, or scratch an itch. Individuals describe the need to tic as a buildup of tension that they consciously choose to release, as if they "had to do it". Examples of this premonitory urge are the feeling of having something in one's throat or a localized discomfort in the shoulders, leading to the need to clear one's throat or shrug the shoulders. The actual tic may be felt as relieving this tension or sensation, similar to scratching an itch. Another example is blinking to relieve an uncomfortable sensation in the eye. Some people with tics may not be aware of the premonitory urge. Children may be less aware of the premonitory urge associated with tics than are adults, but their awareness tends to increase with maturity.

Complex tics are rarely seen in the absence of simple tics. Tics "may be challenging to differentiate from compulsions", as in the case of klazomania (compulsive shouting).

== Diagnosis ==
Tic disorders occur along a spectrum, ranging from mild (transient or chronic tics) to more severe; Tourette syndrome is the more severe expression of a spectrum of tic disorders, which are thought to be due to the same genetic vulnerability. Nevertheless, most cases of Tourette syndrome are not severe. Management for the spectrum of tic disorders is similar to the management of Tourette syndrome.

Tic disorders are defined based on symptoms and duration. The fifth edition of the Diagnostic and Statistical Manual of Mental Disorders (DSM-5), published in May 2013, reclassified Tourette's and tic disorders as motor disorders listed in the neurodevelopmental disorder category, removed the word "stereotyped" from the definition of tic to better distinguish between stereotypies and tics, replaced transient tic disorder with provisional tic disorder, removed the criterion that tics must occur nearly every day, and removed the criterion that previously had excluded long tic-free periods (months) from counting towards the year needed to diagnose Tourette's or Persistent (Chronic) tic disorders.

=== Differential diagnosis ===
Dystonias, paroxysmal dyskinesias, chorea, other genetic conditions, and secondary causes of tics should be ruled out in the differential diagnosis. Conditions besides Tourette syndrome that may manifest tics or stereotyped movements include developmental disorders, autism spectrum disorders, and stereotypic movement disorder; Sydenham's chorea; idiopathic dystonia; and genetic conditions such as Huntington's disease, neuroacanthocytosis, pantothenate kinase-associated neurodegeneration, Duchenne muscular dystrophy, Wilson's disease, and tuberous sclerosis. Other possibilities include chromosomal disorders such as Down syndrome, Klinefelter syndrome, XYY syndrome, and fragile X syndrome. Acquired causes of tics include drug-induced tics, head trauma, encephalitis, stroke, and carbon monoxide poisoning. Most of these conditions are rarer than tic disorders, and a thorough history and examination may be enough to rule them out, without medical or screening tests.

Although tic disorders are commonly considered to be childhood syndromes, tics occasionally develop during adulthood; adult-onset tics often have a secondary cause. Tics that begin after the age of 18 are not diagnosed as Tourette's syndrome, but may be diagnosed as an "other specified" or "unspecified" tic disorder.

Tests may be ordered as necessary to rule out other conditions: For example, when diagnostic confusion between tics and seizure activity exists, an EEG may be ordered, or symptoms may indicate that an MRI is needed to rule out brain abnormalities. TSH levels can be measured to rule out hypothyroidism, which can be a cause of tics. Brain imaging studies are not usually warranted. In teenagers and adults presenting with a sudden onset of tics and other behavioral symptoms, a urine drug screen for cocaine and stimulants might be necessary. If a family history of liver disease is present, serum copper and ceruloplasmin levels can rule out Wilson's disease.

Individuals with obsessive–compulsive disorder (OCD) may present with features typically associated with a tic disorder, such as compulsions that may resemble motor tics. "Tic-related OCD" is hypothesized to be a subgroup of OCD, distinguished from non-tic-related OCD by the content and type of obsessions and compulsions; individuals with tic-related OCD have more intrusive thoughts, and exhibit more hoarding and counting rituals than individuals with non-tic-related OCD.

Tics must also be distinguished from fasciculations. Small twitches of the upper or lower eyelid, for example, are not tics, because they do not involve a whole muscle, rather are twitches of a few muscle fibre bundles, that are not suppressible.

== See also ==
- Yale Global Tic Severity Scale, a psychological measure designed to identify symptoms of disorders relating to attention and impulsivity, such as tic disorder, Tourette's syndrome, and obsessive-compulsive disorder, in children and adolescents between ages 6 to 17.
