= Myrtle Byram McGraw =

Developmental psychologist (1899-1988)

- Born: August 1, 1899; Birmingham, Alabama
- Died: September 6, 1988 (aged 89); Hastings-on-Hudson, New York
- Education: Ph.D.
- Alma mater: Ohio Wesleyan University; Columbia University
- Occupation: Psychologist
- Spouse: Rudolph F. Malina (m. 1936; death 1970)
- Children: Mitzi Wertheim
- Parent(s): Riley McGraw (father); Mary Byram (mother)

Myrtle Byram McGraw (August 1, 1899 – September 6, 1988) was an American psychologist, neurobiologist, and child development researcher.

== Education ==
Myrtle was born in Birmingham, Alabama, the fifth of seven children of the farmer Riley McGraw and his seamstress wife Mary Byram. She grew up in an area that was still recovering from the aftermath of the American Civil War. After completing a sixth grade level of education, she took a course in a local business school to learn shorthand and typing. Afterward, she was hired by a law office, where she worked for the next two years at a salary of $3 per hour. While there, the lawyer for whom she worked had the foresight to encourage her to continue her education. He helped her to enroll at the Snead Seminary, which at the time was a private Methodist boarding school. To pay her way, she worked as secretary to the school headmistress.

As a teenager at Snead, in 1916 McGraw read an article in the Independent about the eminent American psychologist John Dewey. Shortly thereafter she wrote to him about the article, and was surprised when he responded. The two continued to correspond until McGraw left for China in 1919, and this would later lead to professional collaboration. After graduating from Snead, she matriculated to Ohio Wesleyan University in 1920 with the goal of eventually attending Columbia University. She graduated with an AB degree in 1923.

McGraw successfully enrolled as a graduate student in the Teachers College at Columbia University, majoring in religious education. She earned extra money typing up the manuscript The Art of Experience for John Dewey, who was a professor of philosophy at Columbia. Upon earning her master's degree, she left to teach at a mountain school in Puerto Rico. However, after a year she became convinced that religion was not the field for her. She returned to Columbia and began studying for a Ph.D. in psychology with the supervision of Helen Thompson Woolley. Dr. Woolley headed up Columbia's Institute of Child Development, and the director of research there hired McGraw as a research assistant. Finally, in 1927, Myrtle was granted a Laura Spelman Rockefeller fellowship, which allowed her to finish up her course work in psychology and neuroanatomy.

Accepting a teaching job at Florida State College for Women as assistant professor of psychology, McGraw began research for her dissertation. Her study was concerning performance differences between Caucasian and African-American children, using a battery of standard tests developed by the Austrian developmental psychologist Charlotte Bühler. Finding subjects for her thesis research in Tallahassee, Florida proved a challenge. She said, "I located subjects by driving around looking for diapers drying on clotheslines". With her investigation complete, McGraw returned to New York in 1929, joining the Institute for Child Guidance as an intern. She completed her dissertation, titled, "A comparative study of a group of southern white and negro infants", and was awarded a doctorate from Columbia in 1931.

== Career ==
With the onset of the Great Depression causing her concern about finding a post-doctoral internship, a former professor of McGraw advised her to talk to Fred Tilney, the director of the Neurological Institute of the College of Physicians and Surgeons of Columbia. She was appointed associate director of the Normal Child Development Study at Babies Hospital in New York City by Tilney in 1930. Her work involved experimental research on child development of the neuromuscular system as a complement to Tilney's own studies of animal neural systems and behavior, and their correlation to humans. McGraw collaborated with Tilney and neuroembryologist George E. Coghill, and incorporated the ideas of John Dewey, to try and understand the growth process.

Her work combined observation with some then-unique approaches to study environmental effects that could optimize motor development in an infant. She became the first to demonstrate a swim reflex in 2–4 month old babies. For several years she performed twin studies, which led to a heralded comparison study titled Growth: A Study of Johnny and Jimmy published in 1935. Among the experiments, she was able to place 13-month old subject Johnny in roller skates and teach him to skate, much to the interest of her fellow researchers and the press. The press retained an interest in this experiment from 1933 to 1942, although the supposed performance differences created between the two due to lab research turned out not to be as significant as initially supposed. McGraw's work continued until the Normal Child Development Study ended early in 1940 due to the war. She remained at the Babies Hospital long enough to complete her second book, The Neuromuscular Maturation of the Human Infant, published in 1943.

A focus of her studies was to unite concepts in biology and physics to reach an understanding of the neurobehavioral development in an infant. She was critiqued as a maturationist by some, but her analysis of neurobehavior was actually more complex. Her work, in collaboration with others including John Dewey, advanced a focus on the reciprocal relationship between experience and the process of neural growth during early development. In this, she disagreed with Arnold Gesell's view on the role of maturation. Her insights have influenced the work of other scientists, including Ronald Oppenheim, Gilbert Gottlieb, Esther Thelen, and Adele Diamond. Her work also influenced the development of water birthing as well as parents applying swimming lessons for infants to encourage motor skill development.

== Domestic life ==
Dr. McGraw was married in 1936 to research engineer Rudolph Mallina. It was an unusual ceremony because they chose marriage by contract based upon a little-used section of the Domestic Relations Law. The contract was signed with State Supreme Court Justice Samuel I. Rosenman as a witness. The following year the couple had a daughter, Mitzi. McGraw spend most of the decade from 1943 in a domestic lifestyle raising her daughter and doing some occasional writing, although she did some teaching at New York University and Adelphi University.

In 1953, she was offered a position with the psychology department at Briarcliff College. The work schedule was favorable, allowing her to still spend time with her daughter. Her husband died in 1970 at the age of 87, and she retired from teaching at Briarcliff in 1972. At the age of 89, she died of pneumonia at her home in Hastings-on-Hudson, New York. Her daughter Mitzi Wertheim said of her, "mother was born at the end of the nineteenth century, she lived in the twentieth century, and she thought in the twenty-first century".
