= Ronald Illingworth =

Ronald Illingworth FRCP FRPS FRSM
- Born: 7 October 1909; Harrogate, England
- Died: 4 June 1990 (aged 80); Bergen, Norway
- Education: Great Ormond Street Hospital
- Spouse: Cynthia Illingworth m.1947
- Awards: MRCS, FRCP, LRCP
- Scientific career
- Fields: Pediatrics, author, writer
- Workplaces: University of Sheffield; Yale University

Ronald Stanley Illingworth (7 October 1909 in Harrogate – 4 June 1990 in Bergen, Norway) was a British born Yorkshireman and a paediatrician of renown. He was also a prolific writer, who wrote some 600 articles and at least 21 books, which were exceedingly popular and sold in large quantities. Illingworth was principally known for being largely responsible for introducing the science and practice of paediatrics to the UK in the early to mid-1940s.

== Life ==
Illingworth was the youngest of three children of Ellen Brayshaw and her husband, Herbert Edward Illingworth, an architect. He was educated in Clifton House Preparatory School, then Bradford Grammar School. He achieved a scholarship in classics to read medicine at the University of Leeds. After a number of house appointments, Illingworth was appointed as a clinical pathologist in general practice at Great Ormond Street Hospital. Before the war he was awarded a Nuffield research studentship in Oxford from the Nuffield Foundation and in 1939 a Rockefeller research fellowship from the Rockefeller Foundation in 1939. During World War II Illingworth was conscripted into the Royal Army Medical Corps with the rank of Lieutenant Colonel in charge of medical divisions in several military hospitals

After the war, he took up the Rockefeller Research Fellowship and spent six months in New Haven, United States. He worked with the clinical psychologist and paediatrician Arnold Gesell at Yale University. He became interested in and studied Gessels theory on child development, known as Gesell's Maturational Theory. He studied it extensively, advocated for and taught it for the rest of his working life.

On his return to the UK he was appointed to a position as an assistant to the consultant paediatrician at Great Ormond Street Hospital. In 1947 he took up first chair of child health at the University of Sheffield, a position he held for 28 years until his retirement.

Illingworth was considered an excellent lecturer, who could deliver three or four lectures in a day, as a broadcaster he was equally persuasive. He was considered a constructive critic. The Nuffield Professor of Child Health, Otto Herbert Wolff who presented the James Spence Medal to Illingworth, noted at the presentation that as a writer, the "quality of his writing is crisp, clear and simple of phrase and not a word to spare".

In 1947, Illingworth married fellow physician Cynthia Redhead and together they had two daughters and a son. Their children all became physicians. The couple had six grandchildren.

== Photography ==
Illingworth was considered a renowned photographer and was a Fellow of the Royal Photographic Society and a frequent lecturer at photographic societies. When he was a student Illingworth sold photos to the press to pay his living costs. During his career he built up a large collection of microscope slides, more than 4000, which he used for teaching.

== Awards and honours ==
- Medal of the University of Turku, Finland, 1974.
- Aldrich Award of the American Academy of Pediatrics.
- James Spence Medal, 1977.
- Dawson Williams Prize of the British Medical Association.

Illingworth was also awarded honorary degrees from Sheffield and Leeds. In 1982 he was awarded the Freedom of the City of Sheffield.

== Bibliography ==
Illingworth published some 600 articles and several books. These are some of his most notable:

- Babies and young children: feeding, management and care (with Cynthia Illingworth). Churchill Livingstone, 7th edn 1984.
- Recent advances in cerebral palsy. Foreword by Norman B. Capon. J. & A. Churchill, 1958.
- The Normal Child. Some problems of the early years and their treatment. Churchill Livingstone, 7th edn, repr. 1981.
- The development of the infant and the young child: normal and upnormal. Churchill Livingstone, 8th edn 1983.
- The Normal School Child. His problems, physical and emotional. Churchill Livingstone, 10th edn, repr. 1992.
- An introduction to developmental assessment in the first year. National Spastics Society.
- The child at school : a paediatrician's manual for teachers. Wiley, 1974.
- Common symptoms of disease in children. 1967. Blackwell.
- Basic developmental screening, 0–2-year. Oxford: Blackwell Scientific Publications; distributed in the US by F. A. Davis Co., Philadelphia. 1973.
- Common ailments in toddlers. British Medical Association. [1960] Series: Family doctor booklet.
- Infections and immunisation in childhood. Edinburgh; New York: Churchill Livingstone, 1981.
- An Introduction to Development Assessment in the First Year Preface by Dr Mary D. Sheridan. [With illustrations]. National Spastics Society (Medical Education and Information Unit), 1962.
- Some Aspects of Child Health. Sheffield, 1949.
- All about feeding your baby. British Medical Association, 1966.
- Children and sleep. Family Health Publications, [1956?]
- All about Feeding your Baby, illustrated by Gavin Rowe. Corgi, 1971.
- Toddlers-common problems. British Medical Association. British Medical Association, 1987.
- Basic developmental screening: 0–4 years. Blackwell Scientific, 1994.
- Common ailments in babies. British Medical Association, 1980.
- Lessons from childhood: some aspects of the early life of unusual men and women (with Cynthia M Illingworth). E. & S. Livingstone, 1969.
- The treatment of the child at home. Blackwell Scientific, 1972.
