= Manhattan Research, Inc. =

Compilation album by Raymond Scott
- Released: 2000
- Recorded: 1953–1969
- Genres: Electronic, jingles, lounge
- Length: 122 minutes
- Label: Basta Audio-Visuals
- Producers: Gert-Jan Blom and Jeff Winner
- Compiler: Gert-Jan Blom

Professional ratings
Review scores
Source	Rating
Allmusic	link
The A.V. Club	(favorable) March 29, 2002
PopMatters	Best of 2000 list
Salon.com	(favorable) June 13, 2000 Archived 2012-10-15 at the Wayback Machine

Manhattan Research, Inc. is a two-CD compilation of electronic music created by the musician, composer and inventor, Raymond Scott and his company, "Manhattan Research Inc." Posthumously released in 2000 by Basta Music of the Netherlands, the album contains selected samples of Scott's work from the 1950s and 1960s for film soundtracks, commercials, and for his own technical and musical experiments.

The synthesizers, sequencers, and drum-machines used were designed and constructed by Raymond Scott.

== Background ==
Scott would often describe Manhattan Research, Inc. as "More than a think factory - a dream center where the excitement of tomorrow is made available today." The material, while never intended for commercial release, provides insight into Scott's work. Included among the tracks on the album are commercials for companies such as Ford Motor and IBM, a humorous "Audio Logo" collage entitled "Don't Beat Your Wife Every Night!", and various collaborations with Jim Henson (of Muppets fame). The album features a number of Scott's inventions including the Clavivox keyboard, Circle Machine, Bass Line Generator, Rhythm Modulator, Karloff, Bandito the Bongo Artist, and the auto-composing Electronium.

Much of the audio selections, as well as the images for the accompanying 144-page book, were culled from the University of Missouri Kansas City's extensive collection of Raymond Scott material. Album producers Gert-Jan Blom and Jeff Winner worked with several of the university's staff in choosing material for the project. During the process, the two producers were impressed by the quality and fidelity of the recordings, despite being some thirty to forty years old. Due to Scott's meticulous attention to detail, "They were so well recorded that almost no audio correction was necessary during the mastering" of the album." In the CD notes, Blom & Winner write, "Scott sought to master all aspects of sound capture and manipulation. His special interest in the technical aspects of recording, combined with the state-of-the-art facilities at his disposal, provided him with enormous hands-on experience as an engineer."

== Track listing ==
=== Disc one ===
1. Manhattan Research, Inc. Copyright (0:11, c. 1959)
2. Baltimore Gas & Electric Co. (Instrumental, Take 4) (1:14, c. 1959)
3. Bendix 1: "The Tomorrow People" (1:06, c. 1963)
4. Lightworks (1:52, c. 1959)
  - Vocal by Dorothy Collins
5. The Bass-line Generator (3:10, c. 1965)
6. "Don't Beat Your Wife Every Night!" (1:44, c. 1961)
  - Announced by 'Bucky' Coslow
7. "B.C. 1675" (The "Gillette" Conga Drum Jingle) (3:16, c. 1957)
8. Vim (0:59, c. 1960)
9. Auto-Lite: Sta-Ful (Instrumental) (0:47, c. 1961)
10. Sprite: "Melonball Bounce" (Instrumental) (1:01, c. 1963)
11. Sprite: "Melonball Bounce" (1:01, c. 1963)
12. Wheels That Go (0:50, c. 1967)
13. Limbo: The Organized Mind (4:33, c. 1966)
  - Narrated by Jim Henson
14. "Portofino" 1 (2:13, c. 1962)
15. County Fair (1:01, c. 1962)
16. Lady Gaylord (1:02, c. 1964)
17. Good Air (Take 7) (0:38, 1953)
18. IBM MT/ST: The Paperwork Explosion (1967, c. 4:31)
19. Domino (0:33, c. 1959)
20. Super Cheer (0:34, c. 1963)
21. Cheer: Revision 3 (New Backgrounds) (0:39, c. 1963)
22. "Twilight in Turkey" (1:32, c. 1967)
23. Raymond Scott Quote / Vicks: Medicated Cough Drops (1:34, c. 1960)
  - Vocal by Dorothy Collins
24. Vicks: Formula 44 (0:46, c. 1964)
25. Auto-Lite: Spark Plugs (1:00, c. 1961)
26. Nescafé (1960, c. 1:06)
27. Awake (0:35, c. 1959)
28. "Backwards Overload" (6:04, c. 1968)
29. Bufferin: "Memories" (Original) (0:59, 1967)
  - Narrated by Jim Henson
30. Bandito the Bongo Artist (1:30, c. 1959)
31. "Night and Day" (Cole Porter) (1:45, c. 1968)
32. Baltimore Gas & Electric Co. ("395") (1:07, c. 1959)
33. K2r (0:19, c. 1962)
34. IBM Probe (1:56, c. 1962)
35. GMGM 1A (1:49, c. 1963)
36. The Rhythm Modulator (3:37, c. 1954)

=== Disc two ===
1. Ohio Plus (0:17, c. 1967)
2. "In the Hall of the Mountain Queen" (0:49, c. 1967)
3. General Motors: Futurama (1:04, c. 1964)
4. "Portofino" 2 (2:14, c. 1962)
5. "The Wild Piece" (a.k.a. "String Piece") (4:07, c. 1969)
6. "Take Me to Your Violin Teacher" (1:40, c. 1969)
7. Ripples (Original Soundtrack) (0:59, c. 1967)
8. Cyclic Bit (1:04, c. 1959)
9. Ripples (Montage) (4:06, c. 1966)
10. The Wing Thing (1:00, c. 1963)
11. County Fair (Instrumental) (1:00, c. 1962)
12. "Cindy Electronium" (1:59, c. 1959)
13. "Don't Beat Your Wife Every Night!" (Instrumental) (1:45, c. 1961)
14. Hostess: Twinkies (0:32, c. 1963)
15. Hostess: Twinkies (Instrumental) (0:32, c. 1963)
16. Ohio Bell: Thermo Fax (0:24, c. 1960)
17. "The Pygmy Taxi Corporation" (7:11, c. 1969)
18. Baltimore Gas & Electric Co. (Announce Copy, Take 1) (0:29, c. 1959)
19. Baltimore Gas & Electric Co. (0:44, c. 1959)
20. Lightworks (Slow) (1:40, c. 1959)
21. The Paperwork Explosion (Instrumental) (3:30, c. 1962)
22. Auto-Lite: Ford Family (1:03, c. 1961)
23. Auto-Lite: Ford Family (Instrumental) (0:54, c. 1961)
24. Raymond Scott Quote / Auto-Lite: "Wheels" (1:50, 1961)
25. Bufferin: "Memories" (Demo) (0:44, c. 1967)
  - Narrated by Jim Henson
26. "Space Mystery" (Montage) (5:11, c. 1963)
27. "The Toy Trumpet" (2:15, c. 1967)
28. "Backwards Beeps" (1:05, c. 1967)
29. Raymond Scott Quote / Auto-Lite: Sta-Ful (1:36, c. 1961)
30. Lightworks (Instrumental) (1:29, c. 1959)
31. "When Will It End?" (3:14, c. 1967)
32. Bendix 2: "The Tomorrow People" (1:03, c. 1963)
33. Electronic Audio Logos, Inc. (5:23, c. 1959)
