= Ernesto Caffo =

Italian neuropsychiatrist (1950-)

Ernesto Caffo (born 16 May 1950, Modena) is the founder and President of SOS Il Telefono Azzurro Onlus and Fondazione Child. He is a Chair Professor of Child and Adolescent Psychiatry at the University of Modena and Reggio Emilia, full-time Director of the Department of Paediatrics for the Hospital of University of Modena, and director of the 6th edition of the Master Assessment and Intervention in situations of child abuse and pedophilia at the University of Modena and Reggio Emilia.

== Education and training ==
He was born in Modena. He undertook a degree in Medicine from the University of Bologna.

In 1975, he took a residency program in Medicine from the University of Bologna and joined the Order of Physicians and Surgeons of Bologna. In 1980, he obtained a residency certification in Child Neuropsychiatry from the University of Modena.

In 1983, he also obtained a residency certification in Systemic Family Therapy from the Centre for the Study of the Family in Milan and a residency certification in Psychiatry at the University of Modena. Throughout the years, his research and major academic contribution focused on trauma, autism, child abuse and violence and in particular on treatment evaluation in child and adolescent psychiatry.

Since 2001, he is Full Professor in child neuropsychiatry in the Faculty of Medicine at the University of Modena and Reggio Emilia. In 2002, he has been nominated Director of the Advanced Master "assessment and intervention in situation of child abuse and pedophilia" from the University of Modena and Reggio Emilia. Since 2003, he is Medical Director at the Hospital of the University of Modena and Reggio Emilia by taking care of the department of Pediatrics. Under this role, he also gave birth to the Program called "Development of Child Neuropsychiatry". From 2008 to 2009 he was Associate Professor of Child and Adolescent Psychiatry at the Faculty of Psychology of the Sapienza, University of Rome.

== Scientific career ==
Between 1975 and 1998 he spent time delivering professional training in the United States in prestigious universities such as Harvard University (M. Belfer, B. Brazelton), Columbia (D.Schaffer, A.Green, R.Klin,), New York University (G. Jung, D. Koplewitz), University of Denver (H.Kempe, F.Coppolillo), San Francisco (H.Philips).

Moreover, in 2003 he has been visiting professor at the Child Study Center at Yale. During this period, he furthered his studies and research on trauma and abuse in subjects in childhood, externalizing behaviours in adolescence, autism and related disorders. He is currently also a member of an international research consortium coordinated by Prof.J. Goodyear at the University of Cambridge on the subject of depression in children and adolescents that includes the University of Marburg (Prof. Prof.H Remschmidt), Utrecht (Prof.H. Van Engeland), Athens (Prof. S. Tsiantis).

In 1988 he was one of the founders of the International Forum for Child Welfare, the organization which unites the most important world associations dealing with the problems of children. He was President of that organization from 1994–96. Since 2003, he has been involved in the Global Program on Child and Mental Health, sponsored by the World Psychiatric Association (WPA), as well as in numerous international research consortia promoted by International Association for Child and Adolescent Psychiatry and Allied Professions (IACAPAP) in the field of mental disorders in children, particularly autism, pervasive developmental disorders and mood disorders. Throughout the years, he actively engaged at an academic level to train researchers and trigger the scientific debate over the genetic and environmental aspects of childhood psychiatric disorders. He also organized several research and training seminars on the treatment of victims of traumatic events in childhood, offering an introduction to the most important evidence-based cognitive behavioral therapies for the treatment of children and adolescents victims of trauma and disaster. The last of these meetings was on the Trauma Focused CBT - a model developed by Anthony Mannarino and Judith Cohen in the US, who led the panel in Modena in 2013.

In 2000, he established the International Child and Adolescent Psychiatry Training Seminar, an annual training and panel discussion that brings together junior researchers and experts to exchange scientific knowledge in the field of child and adolescent psychiatry. The Child and Adolescent Psychiatry Training Seminar has built up a renowned reputation in training researchers and triggering the scientific debate over the genetic and environmental aspects of childhood psychiatric disorders. As of 2015, the Seminar is at its 11th edition.

== Boards' membership ==
He is currently a board member of the International Centre for Missing & Exploited Children (ICMEC), Coordinator of the Global Health Coalition, Missing Children Europe. He is also President of Children First Foundation, ERICE (Empowerment and Resilience in Children Everywhere), the Commission on Child Adversities within the Mental Health Coalition at Harvard University led by Prof. Ron Kessler. Since 2005, he is an honorary member of the American Academy of Child and Adolescent Psychiatry (AACAP).

Moreover, from 1984 to 1998 he was Director of the journal Bambino Incompiuto and Member of the Editorial Board of several international journals dealing with child psychiatry such as Child Abuse & Neglect International Journal, European Journal of Child Psychiatry, Imago, Psichiatria dell'infanzia e dell'adolescenza.

From 2001, he actively followed the activities of the international consortium promoted by IACAPAP (International Association for Child and Adolescent Psychiatry and Allied Professions) in the areas of developmental disorders, particularly on autism, pervasive developmental and mood disorders.

Previously, he worked as an expert for the National Centre of Documentation and Analysis for Childhood and Adolescence - Innocenti Institute. He also held the following positions:

- From 2001 to 2004 he was Vice-President of SINPIA (Italian Society of Psychiatry of the Child)
- In 2007 he was Secretary General of Associazione per Lo Studio in Psichiatria Dell'infanzia (A.S.P.I.A)
- From 2003 to 2007 he was President ESCAP (European Society for Child and Adolescent Psychiatry)
- Since 2006 he has been President of the European Academy of Child Psychiatry
- From 2006 to 2012 a board member of the European Network for Street Children

== Activism in the not for profit sector ==
He committed his life to promote children's rights both at a national and international level. Since an early age, he put serious efforts in tackling child abuse and its ramifications both from a policy and medical-related perspective. He has carried out several projects for children and adolescents, including the development of hotlines and helplines on issues of child abuse, emergency and missing children.

=== Telefono Azzurro ===
Telefono Azzurro was set up in Bologna (Italy) in 1987. By Italian Presidential Decree of 18 December 1990, Telefono Azzurro gained recognition as a non-profit organization as a result of the important work it was carrying out to defend children's rights.

In 1990, the first toll-free telephone hotline for children (1.96.96 – which is available 24 hours a day, 365 days a year) was set up. It currently also takes calls from adults who want to report on missing or exploited children. The association's foundation was a concrete response to the International Convention on the Right of the Child that was signed by the United Nations in 1989. Telefono Azzurro has contributed to the international debate concerning the rights of the child by promoting and sharing knowledge concerning the Convention on the Rights of the Child, which was adopted signed in 1989 by the United Nations and ratified by Italy in 1991, and the European Convention of Strasburg that was signed in 1996.
Following the agreement between the Ministers for Communication, Equal Opportunities, Work and Social Policies, in February 2003, Telefono Azzurro was entrusted to manage the pilot phase of the 114 Childhood Emergency Hotline.

=== Fondazione Child ===
In 1998 he founded Foundation Child, which he chairs. Its aim is to promote a child-centered culture through a close examination of the causes and treatments of physical and mental diseases. It was established by the contribution of "SOS Il Telefono Azzurro Onlus- National Helpline for the Prevention of Child Abuse". The Foundation Child supports research initiatives such as conferences and trainings in order to expand and promote research in the field of children and adolescent's mental health. The Foundation's main projects are the following:

- International Training Seminar
- ERICE (Empowerment and Resilience in Children Everywhere)
- Speak Up for Kids

== Institutional appointments ==
Ernesto Caffo has actively engaged with institutions to promote the wellbeing of children on a national scale.

He has been appointed as member of the National Observatory on Childhood andAdolescence within the Italian Minister of Welfare from 2001 to 2006 and from 2010 to 2014.

He is also Member of the Scientific Committee CICLOPE, namely the Inter Ministerial Committee fighting Pedophilia.

== Conferences ==
Ernesto Caffo organised several conferences to trigger the debate in the field of Child and Adolescent Mental Health. Some of these are:

- International Conference: Verso un Nuovo Approccio alla Salute Mentale dei Bambini e degli Adolescenti. Nuovi Paradigmi e Nuove Collaborazioni nella Ricerca, nella Formazione e nei Servizi - Modena, Italy, 21 January 2014
- Io non ho più paura: il benessere psicosociale dopo il Terremoto dell'Emilia: dalla Ricerca all'Intervento - Modena, Italy 1 October 2012
- The future roles of cutting edge methods in the study and treatment of childhood disorders - Italian Academy, Columbia University Morningside Campus, New York 25 October 2010.
- 13th ESCAP International Congress - Declaration of Florence (2007) Children's Psychic Wellbeing in Europe: plans and perspectives - Florence 25–29 August 2007

He also participated and contributed to the smooth organisation of the following conferences:

- Empowerment & Resilience in Children Everywhere – ERICE, Round Table Discussion with James F. Leckman, MD, PhD, Shafiq Masalha, MD & Prof. Ernesto Caffo at Yale School of Medicine, New Haven 25 August 2015
- 15th World Congress of Psychiatry organised by the World Psychiatric Association - Buenos Aires, Argentina, 18–22 September 2011.
- 3rd EMACAPAP Child and Adolescent Psychiatry Autism Spectrum Disorders and Research Design - Djerba, Tunisia 3–7 April 2006
- XVI IACAPAP World Congress, Facilitating Pathways – Care, Treatment and Prevention in Child and Adolescent Mental Health - Berlin, Germany 22–26 August 2004
- Child and Adolescent Psychiatry and Mental Health in Eastern Mediterranean, Depression and related disturbs - Sharm El Sheikh, Egypt 27 February– 4 March 2004
- "Protecting Childhood in Contexts of War and Terrorism" Rome, Italy 16–19 July 2003
- Autism: from Research to Clinical Practice. Rome, Italy 17–21 March 2003
- Caring for children and adolescents with mental disorders, World Health Organisation. Geneva, Switzerland 31 January – 1 February 2002
- IACAPAP working group Declaration of Modena - Genetics of Autism. Modena, Italy 16 –18 March 2000
- EMACAPAP - Declaration of Sharm El Sheikh - Declaration of the Founding of the Eastern Mediterranean Association of Child and adolescent psychiatry and Allied Professions - Sharm El Sheik, Egypt 8 February 2000
- IACAPAP working group - Declaration of Venice - Autism and Pervasive Developmental Disorders. Venice, Italy 1998
- IACAPAP working group - Declaration of Venice - Principles for Organizing Mental Health Systems for Children and Adolescents - Venice, Italy April 1996
