= Gesell Institute =

501c(3)non-profit organization located in New Haven

Gesell Institute of Child Development
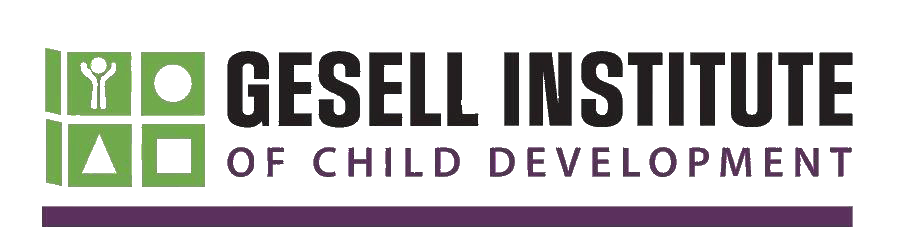
- Gesell Institute headquarters in New Haven, CT
- Formation: 1950
- Type: 501c(3) Non-profit Organization
- Purpose: To promote the principles of child development as the basis for all decision making for young children.
- Headquarters: Yale University Campus
- Location: 310 Prospect St. New Haven, CT 06511
- Region served: United States, Canada
- Executive Director: Dr. Peg Oliveira
- Affiliations: Yale University
- Website: http://www.gesellinstitute.org

The Gesell Institute of Child Development is a 501c(3)non-profit organization located in the Gesell Institute building on the campus of Yale University in New Haven, Connecticut, United States. It promotes to and educates child care professionals on the principles of child development originally laid down by the institutional namesake, Arnold Gesell.

== History ==
=== Inception ===
The Gesell Institute was founded in 1950 by Dr. Louise Bates Ames and Dr. Frances Ilg alongside Janet Learned after Gesell's retirement from the Yale Child Study Center the previous year. Shortly afterward a Gesell Nursery School was founded adjacent to the institute and provided practical experience to those studying child development.

Between 1961 and 1984, the Gesell Institute offered post-doctorate fellowships in ophthalmology.

In 1964, the three-volume set Soothing Sounds for Baby was released as a collaboration with American composer Raymond Scott.

=== Today ===
Currently the organization maintains its headquarters in the original Gesell Institute building on the campus of Yale University. Outside of the main office, a group of educators called the National Lecture Staff traverse the United States conducting workshops which teach attendees to administer the Gesell Developmental Observation-Revised(GDO-R) assessment.

== Gesell Developmental Observation-Revised (GDO-R) ==
The GDO-R is a comprehensive multi-dimensional assessment system that assists educators, and other (child care) professionals in understanding the characteristics of child behavior in relation to typical growth patterns between 2½ and 9 years of age. It is based on the developmental schedules created by Arnold Gesell which detail the patterns and sequences of child development recorded during his large scale observational studies.
