= Bruno Falissard =

French psychiatrist

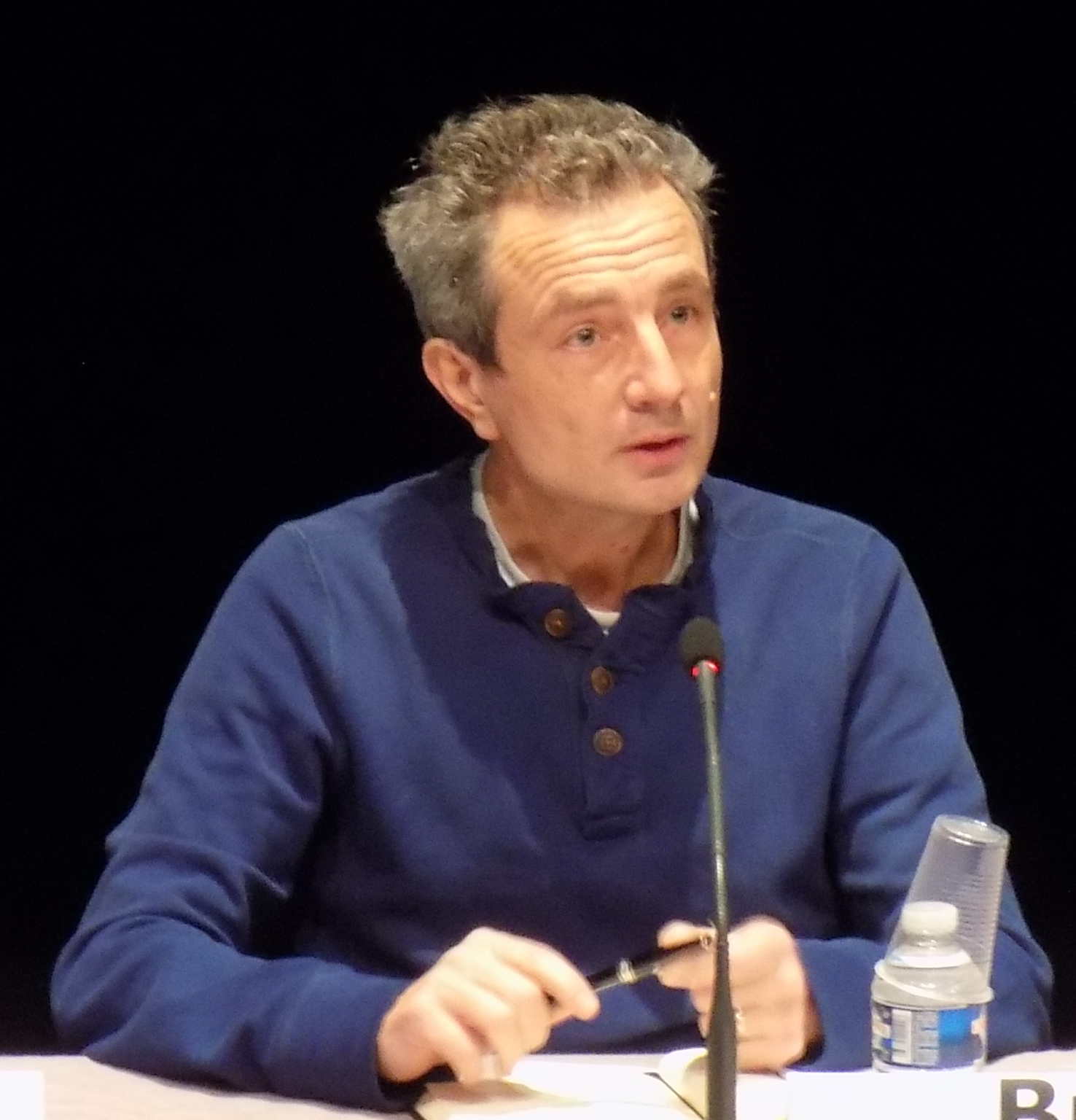
- Born: 17 October 1961 (age 65)
- Occupations: psychiatrist, and academic

Academic background
- Education: Ecole Polytechnique, Paris; University of Paris XI

Academic work
- Institutions: Paris-Saclay Medical University

Bruno Falissard is a French psychiatrist, and academic. He is a professor of Biostatistics at Paris-Saclay Medical University, the Director of the CESP (INSERM centre for research in epidemiology and population health), and the former President of the IACAPAP (International Association for Child and Adolescent Psychiatry and Allied Professions).

Falissard has published over 340 articles. His research primarily focuses on drug evaluation, evaluation of unconventional care, epistemology and research methodology in medicine, psychiatry, psychoanalysis, and neuroscience. He is also the author of 5 books entitled, Comprendre et utiliser les statistiques dans les sciences de la vie, Cerveau et psychanalyse: tentative de reconciliation, Mesurer la subjectivité en santé: perspective méthodologique et statistique, Analysis of Questionnaire Data with R. and Soigner la souffrance psychique des enfants.

Falissard is a member of the French Academy of Medicine, and is associated with the committees of several professional organisations across the globe. He served as co-editor of the European Journal of Epidemiology, of European Child Adolescent Psychiatry and as member of the advisory board of the International Journal of Methods in Psychiatric Research.

== Education ==
Following his initial training in mathematics and fundamental physics at Ecole Polytechnique, Paris from 1982 to 1985, Falissard pursued his medical studies at the University of Paris XI. He completed his residency in Psychiatry from 1992 to 1996. His Ph.D. degree was in biostatistics, and his postdoctoral work focused on psychometrics and exploratory multivariate methods.

== Career ==
Falissard started his academic career as an Assistant Professor in child and adolescent psychiatry in 1996, and was promoted to Associate Professor in Public Health in 1997, and became a full Professor in Public Health from 2002. Currently, he also serves as the Head of the Center of Epidemiology and Population Health.

Falissard served as the President of the French Biometrics Society from 1999 to 2001, as Chairman of the Scientific Council of the Paris-Sud Faculty of Medicine from 2001 to 2004, and as Chairman of the Autism Committee of the Fondation de France from 2007 to 2009. He has been serving as the President of the scientific council of the OFDT (French observatory for drugs and drug addiction) from 2012 till 2022, as a member of National Academy of Medicine since 2015, and as a President of IACAPAP (International Association for Child and Adolescent Psychiatry and Allied) from 2015 to 2018.

== Research ==
Falissard has worked on statistics, psychoanalysis and child and adolescent psychiatry. In statistics, he found how to represent optimally a correlation matrix by points on a 3-dimensional sphere. This representation preserves the topological structure of the correlation matrix and is more accurate than the more classical Principal Components Analysis. From the end of the XXth century to the mid of the 2010s, Falissard did research in epidemiology (as the co-principal investigator of mental health in prison study and in methodology of subjective measurements in health and in particular in psychopathology. In particular, he developed an outcome measure in schizophrenia, which made it possible to show that "in patients with schizophrenia, symptoms improvement can be uncorrelated with quality of life improvement." After that he engaged more in the epistemology of mental health research, and took many positions in the national media (the questionable place of genetics studies in psychiatric research, the potential misuse of medications in child and adolescent psychiatry, the insufficiency of health policies in child and adolescent psychiatry, the inappropriate importance of the place of neurosciences in psychiatric training. For his research in the field, he was awarded the Ülkü Ülgür International Scholar Award by the American Academy of Child and Adolescent Psychiatry in 2019.

Falissard published a series of papers addressing psychiatric disorders, disability, mental health or subthreshold manifestations. While emphasizing on the importance of early detection of child and adolescent mental disorders, he discussed potential problems with early detection of mental disorders in youths, and also highlighted clinical, psychological, societal and economical factors that can render the effective early detection programs a complete failure. In 2015, he focused his studies on evaluation processes of non-pharmacological treatments in child and adolescent psychiatry, and questioned biology as the only theoretical framework relevant in medicine and psychiatry, and quantitative approaches (particularly randomized designs) as the only standards for evaluating treatments. Moreover, he emphasized how the construct of "Neurodevelopmental disorders" can be problematic in our understanding of some child and adolescent psychiatric disorders.

In 2020, during the COVID pandemic, Falissard criticised the anxiety-provoking nature of the discourse of psychiatrists in the media. In his interview with Juliette Parmentier, he discussed the impact of the COVID-19 crisis on the mental health of young people, and stated that for the 16-25 year old "The main problem for this age group is the total lack of recognition of their sacrifices."

== Bibliography ==
=== Books ===
- Comprendre et utiliser les statistiques dans les sciences de la vie (2005) ISBN 9782294018503
- Cerveau et psychanalyse: tentative de reconciliation (2008) ISBN 9782296050310
- Mesurer la subjectivité en santé: perspective méthodologique et statistique (2008) ISBN 9782294703171
- Analysis of Questionnaire Data with R (2011) ISBN 9781439817667
- Soigner la souffrance psychique des enfants (2021) ISBN 9782738150950

=== Selected articles ===
- Falissard, B. (2015). How should we evaluate non-pharmacological treatments in child and adolescent psychiatry?. European Child & Adolescent Psychiatry, 24(9), 1011–1013.
- Falissard, B. (2016). Early detection of child and adolescent mental disorders: some elements of a necessary debate. European Child & Adolescent Psychiatry, 25(10), 1041–1043.
- Falissard, B., Monégat, M., & Harper, G. (2017). Psychiatry, mental health, mental disability: time for some necessary clarifications. European Child & Adolescent Psychiatry, 26(10), 1151–1154.
- Falissard, B. (2018). Thinking the future of child and adolescent psychiatry: what are we talking about?. European Child & Adolescent Psychiatry, 27(12), 1519–1521.
- Falissard, B. (2020). The pitfalls of universalism in child and adolescent psychiatry. European Child & Adolescent Psychiatry, 29(2), 105–106.
- Falissard, B. (2021). Did we take the right train in promoting the concept of “Neurodevelopmental disorders”?. European Child & Adolescent Psychiatry, 30(2), 179–181.
- Falissard, B., Benoit, L., & Martin, A. (2022). Qualitative methods in child and adolescent psychiatry: the time has come. European Child & Adolescent Psychiatry, 1–4.
