= Daniel A. Geller =

Australian-American pediatrician and psychiatrist

Daniel Albert Geller
- Occupations: Pediatrician, psychiatrist
- Employer: Massachusetts General Hospital

Daniel A. Geller is an Australian-American pediatrician and psychiatrist who specializes in the treatment of pediatric obsessive–compulsive disorder (OCD). Geller is triple board certified in Pediatrics, Psychiatry, and Child & Adolescent Psychiatry, and is director of the Pediatric OCD Program at Massachusetts General Hospital.

== Early life and career ==
Dan Geller had immigrated to the United States in 1987 to train at the Johns Hopkins University and later became a resident of Johns Hopkins and Stanford University School of Medicines.

Geller is known in the medical community for having assembled the largest repository of OCD genetics ever compiled. He is also described in the nonfiction book Saving Sammy by Beth Maloney as the physician who first started successfully treating Pediatric Autoimmune Neuropsychiatric Disorders Associated with Streptococcal infections (PANDAS) using cognitive behavioral therapy.

== Awards ==
In 2013, Geller was recognized for his "innovative research in the field of obsessive compulsive disorder," as the recipient of an Endowed Chair in Psychiatry at Massachusetts General Hospital.

== Bibliography ==
- Geller, Daniel A. (2003). "Which SSRI? A Meta-Analysis of Pharmacotherapy Trials in Pediatric Obsessive-Compulsive Disorder". American Journal of Psychiatry. 160 (11): 1919–1928. doi:10.1176/appi.ajp.160.11.1919. ISSN 0002-953X. PMID 14594734. S2CID 8711232.
- Geller, Daniel A. (July 2001). "Fluoxetine Treatment for Obsessive-Compulsive Disorder in Children and Adolescents: A Placebo-Controlled Clinical Trial". Journal of the American Academy of Child & Adolescent Psychiatry. 40 (7): 773–779. doi:10.1097/00004583-200107000-00011. PMID 11437015.
- Geller, Daniel A.; Karen Dineen Wagner; Graham Emslie; Tanya Murphy; David J. Carpenter; Erica Wetherhold; Phil Perera; Andrea Machin; Christel Gardiner (2004). "Paroxetine Treatment in Children and Adolescents With Obsessive-Compulsive Disorder: A Randomized, Multicenter, Double-Blind, Placebo-Controlled Trial". Journal of the American Academy of Child & Adolescent Psychiatry. 43 (11): 1387–1396. doi:10.1097/01.chi.0000138356.29099.f1. ISSN 0890-8567. PMID 15502598.
