= Soothing Sounds for Baby =

Box set by Raymond Scott
- Released: 1964
- Recorded: 1959–63
- Genre: Electronic
- Labels: Epic Records; Basta Audio-Visuals (1997 reissue)

Soothing Sounds for Baby (1964) is a three-volume set of ambient electronic music by American composer, musician, and inventor Raymond Scott. Scott originally intended to lull infants to sleep with the music, but later generations have found value in the music for its minimalist aspects, often comparing it to the works of Brian Eno, Kraftwerk and Tangerine Dream.

Originally released in collaboration with the Gesell Institute of Human Development, the volumes are split up into three age groups: Volume 1 is 1 to 6 months; Volume 2 is 6 to 12 months; and Volume 3 is 12 to 18 months. The music gets more complex with each volume. Scott created much of the music on the albums with instruments he created, such as the Electronium and the Clavivox. "Particularly on Soothing Sounds for Baby, Scott proved to be one of the first composers to merge the Brave New World of electronic sounds with a rhythmic pop sensibility."

Contemparary reviews characterised the work as "skull splitting".

Basta Music of Holland reissued the albums as 3 individual CDs and as a 3-LP box set in 1997. In 2017, Music On Vinyl in cooperation with Basta Music pressed a limited edition of 1,000 copies on silver-coloured vinyl.
