= Donald J. Cohen =

American physician

Donald Jay Cohen (September 5, 1940 – October 2, 2001) was an American psychiatrist and psychoanalyst. He was director of the Yale Child Study Center and the Sterling Professor of Child Psychiatry, Pediatrics and Psychology at the Yale School of Medicine. According to The New York Times, he made "fundamental contributions to the understanding of autism, Tourette's syndrome and other illnesses" and his work "reshaped the field of child psychiatry." He was also known as a social policy advocate and for his work to promote the interests of children exposed to violence and trauma.

== Life and education ==
Cohen was born in Chicago, Illinois, on September 5, 1940. His father was a businessman. According to his son-in-law and later colleague Andrés Martin, Cohen was an "observant Jew with deep ties to Israel and a lifelong preoccupation with the Holocaust."

Cohen graduated summa cum laude from Brandeis University in 1961 with a BA in philosophy and psychology. He studied philosophy at Cambridge University on a Fulbright fellowship. He obtained his MD in 1966 from the Yale School of Medicine and completed a general psychiatry residency at Massachusetts Mental Health Center and Children's Hospital in Boston and a child psychiatry residency in Washington, D.C.

Cohen died in New Haven, Connecticut, of ocular melanoma on October 2, 2001, at the age of 61. He was survived by his wife, Phyllis Cohen, a psychoanalyst at the Yale Child Study Center, as well as four children, five grandchildren, two brothers, and his mother.

== Career ==
=== Medical ===
Cohen joined the Yale School of Medicine in 1972. Along with other researchers, he had begun looking at non-psychological causes for Tourette syndrome (TS) by 1976. Cohen was named the director of the Yale Child Study Center in 1983, a position he held until his death in 2001. In 2000, he was named the Sterling Professor of Child Psychiatry, Pediatrics and Psychology at Yale. At Yale, he studied personality development, TS management, the effects of stress on developing children, and the interplay between genetic and environmental factors in neuropsychiatric disorders.

According to a former commissioner of the Food and Drug Administration, Cohen "moved child psychiatry into the biological era, but he continued to put emphasis on the psychological and social aspects affecting child development." According to the Yale Bulletin, Cohen made "groundbreaking contributions in biological psychiatry, clinical care and the development of international collaborations in child psychiatry." A pioneer in autism and Tourette syndrome research, he proposed treatments for TS which "opened new avenues to treating and understanding the disorder." His colleague Andrés Martin said his work with autism "was in large part devoted to understanding and listening to those same individuals who had been written off as incapable of communicating meaningfully."

At Yale, Cohen helped found the International Working Group on Children and War. He helped to promote child psychiatry in Gaza and created the Eastern Mediterranean Association of Child and Adolescent Psychiatry and Allied Professions (EMACAPAP), for which he served as chair of the international scientific committee. He also helped found the Yale-New Haven Child Development Community Policing Program to train first responders to help children exposed to violence and trauma and to be able to call in immediate assistance from Yale Child Study Center professionals.

=== Appointments ===
Cohen became a vice-president of the International Association for Child and Adolescent Psychiatry and Allied Professions (IACAPAP) in 1986, and was president from 1992 to 1998. He served as vice-president of the board of governors of Yale University Press, was an analyst at the Western New England Institute for Psychoanalysis, and was a member of the Institute of Medicine of the National Academy of Sciences. He held chair appointments with the Child Health and Development Institute the and Schneider Children's Hospital of Israel, and was International President of the Telefon Azzuro Foundation in Italy. He served on editorial boards in the United States, France, Israel, and Great Britain.

=== Other achievements ===
Cohen is credited with transforming three buildings at Yale to help give the Yale Child Study Center prominence (the Children's Psychiatric Inpatient Service, the Harris-Provence Child Development Unit, and the Nelson and Irving Harris Building), obtaining "prominent and central locations at the medical school for each of these buildings." He also helped bring kosher kitchens to the university.

== Publications ==
Cohen authored or co-authored more than 300 professional articles and 159 book chapters. His books include:

- Volkmar, Fred R.; Paul, Rhea; Klin, Ami; Cohen, Donald J., eds. (2005). Handbook of autism and pervasive developmental disorders: Volume 1 (3rd ed.). Hoboken, NJ: John Wiley & Sons. ISBN 978-0-471-71696-9.
- Leckman, James F.; Cohen, Donald J., eds. (1999). Tourette's syndrome: tics, obsessions, compulsions; developmental psychopathology and clinical care. New York: Wiley. ISBN 978-0-471-11375-1.
- Cohen, Donald J., ed. (1988). Tourette's syndrome and tic disorders: clinical understanding and treatment. New York: Wiley. ISBN 978-0-471-62924-5.
- Cohen, Donald J. (2006). Martin, Andrés; King, Robert A. (eds.). Life is with others: selected writings on child psychiatry. New Haven: Yale University Press. ISBN 978-0-300-11466-9.
- Mayes, Linda C.; Cohen, Donald J. (2002). The Yale Child Study Center guide to understanding your child: healthy development from birth to adolescence. Boston: Little, Brown, and Company. ISBN 978-0-316-95432-7.

He inspired the production of the "first Israeli textbook of child psychiatry in Hebrew, the first modern textbook of child psychiatry in China and a new textbook of child psychiatry in South Korea."

== Legacy ==
Colleague James F. Leckman said: "He fostered the development of the next generation of academic child psychiatrists from many countries, in Europe, Korea, China, as well as Israel," and described him as "committed to forging closer ties between Israel and Palestine through contacts and visits with various psychiatrists, psychologists, and social service agencies active in Gaza and the West Bank."

According to Joe Lieberman:

Dr. Cohen was the first person to suggest a special health insurance program for children that ultimately became the Children's Health Insurance Program. Today, this program throughout the Nation provides health care for millions of children who would otherwise go without the basic care they need to grow up healthy and flourish.

In 2000, the Donald J. Cohen National Child Traumatic Stress Initiative was established "to raise the standard of care and increase access to services for children and families who experience or witness traumatic events." The initiative was introduced as a bill by Senator Joe Lieberman and approved by both houses of the United States Congress to amend the Public Health Service Act to recognize Cohen's contributions to victims of violence-related stress.

In 2002, the Donald J. Cohen and Irving B. Harris Center for Trauma and Disaster Intervention was named at Tel Aviv University to honor Cohen's contributions.

Cohen received the Strecker Award from the Institute of the Pennsylvania Hospital and the Agnes Purcell McGavin Award for Prevention from the American Psychological Association.

Other programs established in his honor include:

- The Donald J. Cohen Fellowship in Developmental Social Neuroscience at Emory University.
- The Donald J. Cohen Fellowship Program for International Scholars in Child and Adolescent Mental Health from the International Association for Child and Adolescent Psychiatry and Allied Professions.
- The Donald J. Cohen Medical Student Training Program at the Vermont Center for Children, Youth, and Families.
