= Gesell's Maturational Theory =

American educator and psychologist

The Maturational Theory of child development was introduced in 1925 by Dr. Arnold Gesell, an American educator, pediatrician and clinical psychologist whose studies focused on "the course, the pattern and the rate of maturational growth in normal and exceptional children"(Gesell 1928). Gesell carried out many observational studies during more than 50 years working at the Yale Clinic of Child Development, where he is credited as a founder. Gesell and his colleagues documented a set of behavioral norms that illustrate sequential & predictable patterns of growth and development. Gesell asserted that all children go through the same stages of development in the same sequence, although each child may move through these stages at their own rate Gesell's Maturational Theory has influenced child-rearing and primary education methods since it was introduced.

== Principles of maturation ==
He believed that a child’s growth & development are influenced by both their environment and genes, but he largely investigated the children's physiological development. He called this process maturation, that is, the process by which development is governed by intrinsic factors, principally the genes.

According to Gesell, the rate at which children develop primarily depends on the growth of their nervous system, consisting of the complicated web of nerve fibers, spinal cord, and brain. As the nervous system grows, their minds develop and their behaviors change accordingly.

=== The Concept of Maturation ===
Gesell observed that maturational development always unfolds in fixed sequences: an embryo's heart is always the first organ to develop, then the central nervous system (the brain and spinal cord), followed by the peripheral organs. After birth, babies first gain control over their lips and tongues, then their eye movements, followed by control over their neck, shoulders, arms, hands, buttocks, fingers, legs, and feet. There is a genetic cephalocaudal (head-to-foot) trend in both prenatal and postnatal development.

As a baby grows, they learn to sit up, stand, walk, and run; these capacities develop in a specific order with the growth of the nervous system, even though the rate of development may vary from child to child. Gesell believed that individual differences in growth rates are a result of the internal genetic mechanisms.

Maturational theory states that while the child’s social and cultural environments also play a role in their development, these socializing forces are most effective when they are harmonious with the inner maturational timetable. Gesell opposed efforts to teach children things ahead of their developmental schedule, asserting that once the nervous system had matured adequately, a child would begin mastering tasks such as sitting up, walking, and talking from their own inner urges.

=== The Study of Patterns ===
Gesell studied infant behavior and how early motor behavior develops. He determined that growth is best measured not quantitatively but in patterns. A pattern can be anything that has a definite shape or form such as an eye blink. Gesell looked for patterns in the process by which actions become organized; for example, the steps in the development of eye-hand coordination. Although the theoretical formulations of Erikson, Piaget, and Havighurst are of value, none adequately address motor development. It is appropriate, therefore, that a theoretical model of motor development that integrates elements from each, plus a dynamic systems and behavior setting perspective, be put forth in order that we may describe and explain this important aspect of human development.

=== Reciprocal Interweaving ===
Gesell created the term "reciprocal interweaving" to describe the developmental process in which two opposite tendencies gradually reach an effective balance. For example, when a child is developing a preference for “handedness”, he or she uses first one hand and then the other, and eventually ends up with a preferred pattern of hand use.

Gesell also applied the concept of reciprocal interweaving to the development of the personality. Gesell asserted that, like motor behaviors, personality also develops as a back and forth pull between two opposite poles. He gave the example of a child going through a cycle of introverted and extroverted tendencies, beginning at age three, until the two tendencies become integrated and balanced. Gesell believed that developmental progress requires temporary loss of equilibrium, but is followed by reintegration at higher levels of organization.

=== Functional Asymmetry ===
Gesell found asymmetric development to be common in children. In motor behaviors, this can be seen in an infant’s tonic neck reflex, where babies prefer to lie with their heads turned to one side and extend their arm to the same side which the head is turned while flexing the other arm behind their head. It is a reflex where the infant directs vision towards the hand or fist in extension.

=== Self-Regulation ===
Gesell believed that even newborns could regulate their own development, and demonstrated that babies were able to determine their own schedules for eating & sleeping.

Gesell also observed self-regulatory mechanisms in personality, overall integration and equilibrium. He interpreted development as a process where behavior advances in a spiral pattern, alternating between equilibrium and disequilibrium as children enter new phases. While tensions arise, these self-regulatory mechanisms ensure that the organism never goes too far in one direction.

=== Individuality ===
Critics often point out that when summarizing his findings, Gesell gave the impression that all children behave in exactly the same way at each age. However, his position was that the developmental sequences are common to all children, but that they vary in their individual rates of growth. He suggested that these growth rates are possibly related to differences in temperament and personality. For example, he speculated that a child who grows slowly might be cautious, even-tempered, and patient; whereas a child who develops more quickly might be more outgoing, happy, and quick to react. Gesell also believed that a child’s environment should be adjusted to his or her temperament and growth style.

== Philosophy of Child-rearing ==
Gesell believed in a child-centered approach to raising children. He urged parents to recognize the genetic schedule that babies are born with, pointing out that it is the product of over three million years of biological evolution He observed that babies appeared to know what they needed and what they were ready to do & learn. He directed parents to look to the children themselves for cues on how to help the child develop as an individual, and to set aside their own expectations of what the baby “ought” to be doing, particularly in the first year of life.

Gesell developed a series of development schedules summarizing the sequences of development in children. He believed that parents familiar with these sequences will become more patient and understanding during times of disequilibrium and instability knowing that they will eventually disappear.

== Criticisms ==
Modern critics of Gesell point out that he put too much emphasis on maturation and not enough on environmental factors such as learning. Criticisms also include that his developmental stages imply too much uniformity as if all children go through the stages at the same age. He does not specify how much variation can be expected at each age. In addition, Gesell’s research was limited to middle-class children in a university setting so critics are hesitant to generalize his findings to other cultures.

Critics also have asserted that the Maturational Theory can be used as an excuse to withhold treatment and educational opportunities from children.

Recent research has challenged Gesell's age norms, showing that newborns may have more abilities than was reported and that his developmental picture may be too slow. Newborns have been found to be a lot “smarter” than Gesell originally reported showing advanced competencies at early ages. Despite the many criticisms, pediatricians and infant specialists still use Gesell’s norms to help them determine what babies should be able to do at various ages
