= Frances Ilg =

American pediatrician and professor

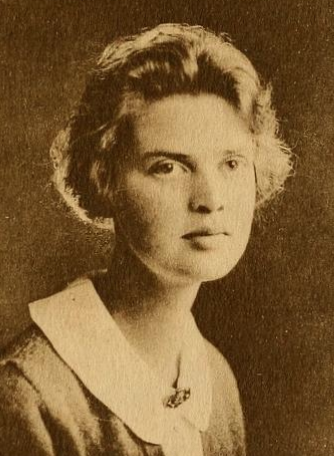
- Frances Ilg, from the 1925 yearbook of Wellesley College
- Born: 1902; Oak Park, Illinois
- Died: July 26, 1981 (aged 78–79); Manitowish Waters, Wisconsin
- Occupation(s): Pediatrician, college professor, writer

Frances Lillian Ilg (1902– July 26, 1981) was an American pediatrician and professor at Yale University. She was an expert in infant and child development, as co-founder and director of the Gesell Institute of Child Development.

== Early life and education ==
Frances Ilg was born in Oak Park, Illinois, the daughter of Joseph Frank Ilg and Leonore Petersen Ilg. Her father worked for the railroad; her maternal grandparents were born in Norway. She graduated from Wellesley College in 1925. She trained as a physician at Cornell Medical School, earning her medical degree in 1929.

== Career ==
Ilg was an assistant professor of child development of Yale University from 1937 to 1947. In 1950, she co-founded the Gesell Institute in New Haven with two colleagues, psychologist Louise Bates Ames and Janet Learned Rodell. She also wrote a newspaper column, "Child Behavior", which was syndicated nationally. In the 1950s and 1960s she counseled parents to "enjoy their children" and "guard their sense of fun and sense of humor"; she also advised school districts to consider emotional maturity as well as intellectual development in grade placements. "We have been over-emphasizing the gifted child," she said. In 1957 she received the William Freeman Snow Award from the American Social Hygiene Association, for "distinguished service to humanity."

== Works ==
- The first five years of life: a guide to the study of the preschool child, from the Yale clinic of child development, 1940
- (with Arnold Gesell) Child development, an introduction to the study of human growth, 1943
- Vision, its development in infant and child, 1946
- (with Arnold Gesell) The child from five to ten, 1946
- L'Enfant de 5 à 10 ans, 1949
- Child behavior, 1951
- The Gesell Institute party book, 1959
- Parents ask, 1962
- (with Louise Bates Ames) Mosaic patterns of American children, 1962
- School readiness; behavior tests used at the Gesell Institute, 1964
- Your four-year-old: wild and wonderful, 1976
- Your three-year-old: friend or enemy, 1976
- Your six-year-old: defiant but loving, 1979
- Your five-year-old: sunny and serene, 1979

== Personal life ==
Ilg adopted a daughter, Tordis, in 1938. Ilg died in 1981, aged 78 years, while vacationing in Manitowish Waters, Wisconsin.
