= Louise Bates Ames =

American psychologist

Louise Bates Ames (October 29, 1908 – October 31, 1996) was an American psychologist specializing in child development. Ames was known as a pioneer of child development studies, introducing the theory of child development stages to popular discourse. Ames authored numerous internationally renowned books on the stages of child development, hosted a television show on child development, and co-founded the Gesell Institute of Child Development in New Haven, Connecticut.

Ames's work found that children go through clear, discrete developmental phases based on age. She demonstrated that various age groups feature unique behavioral patterns, to be considered by parents and doctors in monitoring children's development. Perhaps the best-known legacy of her work was the coining of the term "Terrible Twos," to describe the rigid, conflict-laden behavioral patterns of two-year-olds.

== Life ==
Louise Bates Ames was born on October 29, 1908 in Portland, Maine to Samuel Lewis Bates and Annie Earle Leach Bates. The oldest of three children, Louise was the only daughter of the Bates family. Her father, a respected lawyer and judge, and her mother, a school teacher, valued education and fostered a stimulating educational environment for Ames and her two younger brothers.

Ames attended Portland public schools throughout her primary and secondary education. She developed an interest in debating, history, and literature, and dreamed of becoming a lawyer like her father. After her 1926 high school graduation, Ames attended Wheaton College, a women's college in Norton, Massachusetts. Ames chafed against what she felt was Wheaton's elitist culture and transferred to the University of Maine in 1928. While she had intended to pursue law, an undergraduate course in psychology caught Ames's interest, and in 1930 she graduated from the University of Maine with a degree in psychology. That same year, she married fellow psychology student Smith Ames. They divorced in 1937.

Ames earned a master's degree in psychology from the University of Maine in 1933. That same year, she joined the Yale Clinic of Child Development as research assistant to Arnold Gesell. Ames worked at the clinic from 1933 to 1948, co-authoring a number of works with Gesell, and received her Ph.D. from Yale University in 1936 in experimental psychology. Her dissertation, The sequential patterning of prone progression in the human infant, was published as a journal article in 1937. The paper explored infants' transition to crawling, or "prone progression."

While at the Yale Clinic of Child Development, Ames published a number of works exploring the stages of child development. Over the course of the 1940s, she began translating that work into a trilogy of internationally-successful books. The First Five Years of Life (1940), Infant and Child in the Culture of Today (1943), and The Child From Five to Ten (1946) extended Gesell’s descriptions of children’s stages of growth from motor and cognitive development to that of personal-social activity.

In 1938, Ames made the first of a number of films about child development. Produced for Encyclopedia Films, How Behavior Grows: The Sequential Patterning of Prone Progression was an adaptation of her dissertation on prone progression in infants. In 1944, Ames accepted a position as curator of Yale Films of Child Development.

After her retirement from the Yale Clinic of Child Development, Ames and her colleague Dr. Frances L. Ilg worked with Janet Learned to co-found the Gesell Institute of Child Development. The institute, founded in 1950, is located in New Haven, Connecticut, though operated independently of Yale. Ames was appointed director of research at the institute. At the time, she was also a member of International Council of Women Psychologists. In her work with the council, she conducted a large-scale survey with Harriet Fjeld of women psychologists' professional experiences. The survey was published in the Journal of Social Psychology.

In 1951, Ames and Ilg began a newspaper column, Child Behavior. The question-and-answer column featured write-in questions from parents and advised them with an eye towards child developmental psychology. The column ran for a number of years, leading to their popular book, also titled Child Behavior (1981). In 1962, Bates and Ilg changed the name of the column to Parents Ask, which was the title of another widely selling book they published together that year. At the same time, Bates also worked on a half hour weekly TV show called Child Behavior.

In 1952, Ames (et al.) published a monumental normative study on age and its relation to Rorschach responses. Her findings were published in the trilogy The Master Work Series. Prior to Bates’ research, clinicians had been using a single standard to judge the normality of Rorschach responses. Bates demonstrated that both children and the elderly have patterns of response that are different from other age groups. Her research further supported her existing claim that age must be considered when evaluating the significance of differences in behavior.

Bates was a prolific writer, publishing papers and books until her death in 1996, of thyroid cancer. She died at her granddaughter's home in Cincinnati. Her papers are held at the Library of Congress.

== Works ==
- The first five years of life, 1940
- Infant and child in the culture of today, 1943
- The child from five to ten, 1946
- (with Frances L. Ilg) Child behavior, 1955
- (with Frances L. Ilg and Arnold Gesell) Youth: the years from ten to sixteen, 1956
- (with Frances L. Ilg) Parents ask, 1962
- (with Clyde Gillespie and John W. Streff) Stop school failure, 1972
- (with Ruth W. Metraux, Janet Learned Rodell and Richard Walker) Child Rorschach Responses: developmental trends from two to ten years, 1974
- (with Frances L. Ilg and Sidney Baker) Child behavior: from the Gesell Institute of Human Development, 1981
- Arnold Gesell: Themes of his work, 1989

== Awards ==
- University of Maine Honorary Doctorate of Science (1957)
- Wheaton College Honorary Doctorate of Science (1967)
- Bruno Klopfer Award (1974)
- University of Maine Alumni Career Award (1974)
- Society for Projective Techniques and the Rorschach Institute Honoree (1974)
- Yale University Emeritus Appointment (1996)
