= Susan Swedo =

American neuroscientist

Susan Swedo is an American researcher in the field of pediatrics and neuropsychiatry. Beginning in 1998, she was Chief of the Pediatrics & Developmental Neuroscience Branch at the US National Institute of Mental Health. In 1994, Swedo was lead author on a paper describing pediatric autoimmune neuropsychiatric disorders associated with streptococcal infections (PANDAS), a controversial hypothesis proposing a link between Group A streptococcal infection in children and some rapid-onset cases of obsessive–compulsive disorder (OCD) or tic disorders such as Tourette syndrome. Swedo retired from the NIH in 2019, and serves on the PANDAS Physician Network.

== Biography ==
Swedo received a BA degree from Augustana College in 1977, and an MD from Southern Illinois University School of Medicine in 1980. Her internship and residency in pediatrics were conducted at the Children’s Memorial Hospital of the McGaw Medical Center of Northwestern University. Following completion of her residency, Swedo served as Chief of the Division of Adolescent Medicine at Northwestern until 1986.

In 1986, Swedo she joined Judith L. Rapoport's laboratory as a senior staff fellow in the Child Psychiatry Branch of the National Institute of Mental Health (NIMH). There, she conducted research on pharmacological treatments for childhood obsessive-compulsive disorder (OCD), and was granted tenure in 1992. In 1994, she was named Head of the Section on Behavioral Pediatrics, and from 1995 to 1998 also served as the Acting Scientific Director for NIMH. In 1998, she became Chief of the Pediatrics and Developmental Neuropsychiatry Branch (PDN) at NIMH. At PDN, Swedo conducted research on the causes and treatment of pediatric neuropsychiatric disorders, including OCD, anxiety disorders, and autistic spectrum disorders.

Swedo was a member of the DSM-5 task force, which published an updated version of the Diagnostic and Statistical Manual of Mental Disorders in 2013.

Swedo has won several awards, including the American Academy of Child and Adolescent Psychiatry Award for Scientific Achievement and the American College of Neuropsychopharmacology International Award for Clinical Research.

== PANDAS ==
In 1994, Swedo was lead author on a paper describing Pediatric Autoimmune Neuropsychiatric Disorders Associated with Streptococcal infections (PANDAS). The proposed mechanism, similar to that of rheumatic fever, is one of an inappropriate autoimmune response in the brain, leading to repetitive behaviors. The proportion of cases of these neuropsychiatric disorders, if any, following this mechanism is not clear.

The PANDAS hypothesis is controversial and unproven. As of 2020, the NIH information pages (which Swedo helped write) do not mention the studies that do not support the PANDAS hypothesis.

== Autism study ==
In September 2006, Swedo launched a study of the widespread but unproven use of chelation therapy, which is based on the hypothesis that the mercury-containing vaccine preservative thiomersal is linked with autism. The trial was to compare the chelator DMSA with placebo, with the social and language skills of the subjects being evaluated after twelve weeks. The trial was halted in February 2007 due to ethical concerns about safety following new evidence of risks of permanent cognitive and emotional problems in otherwise-healthy rodents that were given DMSA.

== Bibliography ==
- It's Not All In Your Head: The Real Causes and Newest Solutions to Women's Most Common Health Problem ISBN 978-0-06-251287-1
- Is it "Just a Phase"?: How to Tell Common Childhood Phases from More Serious Problems ISBN 978-0-7679-0391-2
