= Cynthia Illingworth =

English paediatrician and medical author

Cynthia Illingworth FRCP FRCPCH (Hon)
- Born: Cynthia Mary Redhead; 3 August 1920
- Died: 30 August 1999 (aged 79)
- Education: Durham University
- Occupations: paediatrician, medical author
- Relatives: Ronald Illingworth m.1947
- Medical career
- Field: paediatric accident and emergency medicine

Cynthia Mary Illingworth (née Redhead) (3 August 1920 – 30 August 1999) was an English consultant paediatrician and medical author. She was the first consultant in paediatric accident and emergency medicine in the United Kingdom.

== Biography ==
Cynthia Mary Redhead was born in Newcastle upon Tyne on 3 August 1920. Her father, Arthur Blenkinsop Redhead, was an electrical engineer. She was educated at Dame Allan's School and went on to study medicine at Durham University. Her medical training was taken at the Royal Victoria Infirmary, Newcastle, working with the paediatrician Sir James Spence.

In 1947, she took up a position as a lecturer in child health at the University of Sheffield. She was a physician in the paediatric accident and emergency department at Sheffield Children's Hospital. In 1972 she became the first consultant in paediatric accident and emergency medicine in the UK.

In 1947, she married Ronald Illingworth and together they had two daughters and a son. Their children all became physicians. She had six grandchildren.

She enjoyed travel, painting, the theatre, and music.

Illingworth died suddenly on 30 August 1999 of carcinomatosis.

== Selected bibliography ==
Illingworth authored and co-authored more than ten medical text books and several journal articles including:

- Babies and young children : feeding, management and care, by Ronald S Illingworth and Cynthia Illingworth. Churchill Livingstone., 7th ed 1984.
- Lessons from childhood: some aspects of the early life of unusual men and women, by Ronald S Illingworth; Cynthia M Illingworth. E.& S. Livingstone, 1969.
- The diagnosis and primary care of accidents and emergencies in children : a manual for the casualty officer and the family doctor by Cynthia M Illingworth. Blackwell Scientific Publications, 1978
- Babies and young children: a guide for parents by Ronald S Illingworth and Cynthia Illingworth. Churchill Livingstone, 1960
- Babies and young children: feeding, management and care by Ronald S Illingworth and Cynthia Illingworth. Churchill Livingstone. 1954
- 227 road accidents to children by Cynthia Illingworth. Acta Pædiatrica, v68 n6 (December 1979): 869-873
- 225 skateboard injuries in children by Cynthia M. Illingworth; Ann Jay; Dilys Noble; Mary Collick. Clinical Pediatrics, v17 n10 (10/1978): 781-782
