= Raymond Scott =

American musician (1908–1994)

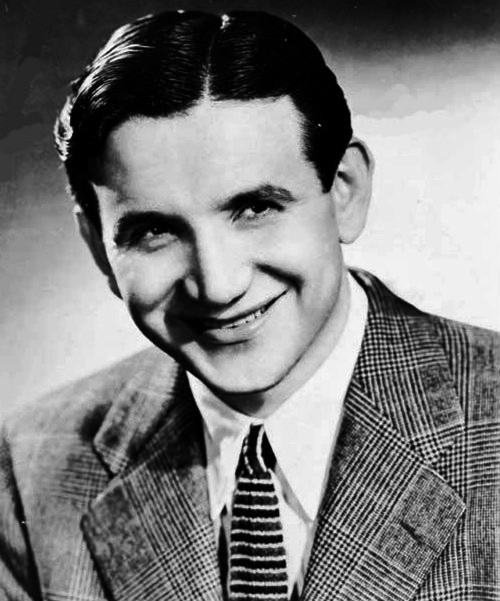

Background information
- Born: Harry Warnow; September 10, 1908; New York City, U.S.
- Died: February 8, 1994 (aged 85) Los Angeles, California, U.S.
- Genres: Jazz; exotica; electronica
- Occupations: Musician; composer; arranger; bandleader; audio engineer; inventor; record producer
- Instruments: Piano; celeste; electronics
- Years active: 1931–1985
- Labels: Brunswick; Columbia; Decca; Master; Audivox; MGM; Coral; Everest; Top Rank; Epic; Basta
- Website: www.raymondscott.net
- Relatives: Mark Warnow (brother)

Raymond Scott (born Harry Warnow; September 10, 1908 – February 8, 1994) was an American composer, bandleader, pianist, record producer, audio engineer, and inventor. In his lifetime he was primarily recognized as a composer of production music and the leader of the Raymond Scott Quintette, but he has since become better known as a pioneer of popular electronic music.

Though Scott was never contracted to compose for animation, Carl W. Stalling adapted his music for more than 120 Looney Tunes and Merrie Melodies films produced by Warner Bros. Cartoons. His compositions may also be heard in The Ren and Stimpy Show (which uses Scott's recordings in twelve episodes), The Simpsons, Duckman, Animaniacs, The Oblongs, Batfink, Puppetoons, and SpongeBob SquarePants. The only time he specifically composed to accompany animation was for three 20-second commercial jingles for County Fair Bread in 1962.

== Early life and career ==
Scott was born Harry Warnow in Brooklyn on September 10, 1908, to Russian Jewish immigrants Joseph and Sarah Warnow. His older brother, Mark Warnow, was a conductor, violinist, and musical director for the CBS radio program Your Hit Parade and encouraged his musical career.

A 1931 graduate of the Juilliard School, where he studied piano, music theory, and composition, Harry began his professional career as a pianist for the CBS Radio house band, conducted by Mark. He adopted the name "Raymond Scott" to spare Mark charges of nepotism when the orchestra began performing his compositions. In 1935, he married Pearl Zimney.

In late 1936, Scott assembled a band from among his CBS colleagues, naming it the Raymond Scott Quintette. It was a six-piece group, but he thought "Quintette" sounded "crisper"; he also told a reporter that he feared "calling it a 'sextet' might get your mind off music." His sidemen were Pete Pumiglio (clarinet); Bunny Berigan (trumpet, later replaced by Dave Wade); Louis Shoobe (double bass); Dave Harris (tenor saxophone); and Johnny Williams (drums). They made their first recordings in New York on February 20, 1937, for Master Records, owned by publisher and lyricist Irving Mills.

The Quintette represented Scott's attempt to revitalize swing music through tight, busy arrangements that de-emphasized improvisation. He termed this style "descriptive jazz" and gave his works unusual titles like "New Year's Eve in a Haunted House", "Dinner Music for a Pack of Hungry Cannibals" (recorded by the Kronos Quartet in 1993), and "Bumpy Weather Over Newark". Although his songs were popular with the public, jazz critics disdained them as novelty music. Besides being prominent in recording studios and on radio and concert stages, Scott wrote and was interviewed for the music magazines DownBeat, Metronome, and Billboard.

Scott believed in composing and playing by ear. He composed not on paper but "on his band"—by humming phrases to his sidemen or by demonstrating riffs and rhythms on the keyboard and instructing players to interpret his cues. Scott recorded the band's rehearsals on discs and used the recordings as references to develop his compositions. He reworked, re-sequenced, and deleted passages, and added themes from other discs to construct finished works. During the developmental process, he let his players improvise, but once complete, he regarded a piece as relatively fixed and permitted little further improvisation. Scott controlled the band's repertoire and style, but he rarely took piano solos, preferring to direct the band from the keyboard and leave solos and leads to his sidemen. He also had a penchant for adapting classical motifs in his compositions.

The Quintette existed from 1937 to 1939 and recorded bestselling discs such as "Twilight in Turkey", "Minuet in Jazz", "War Dance For Wooden Indians", "Reckless Night on Board an Ocean Liner", "Powerhouse", and "The Penguin". One of Scott's popular compositions is "The Toy Trumpet", a cheerful popular music piece that is recognizable instantly to many people who cannot name the title or composer. For the 1938 movie Rebecca of Sunnybrook Farm, Shirley Temple sings a version of the song. Trumpeter Al Hirt's 1964 rendition with Arthur Fiedler and the Boston Pops performed a version. "In an Eighteenth-Century Drawing Room" is a pop adaptation of the beginning theme from Mozart's Piano Sonata in C, K. 545.

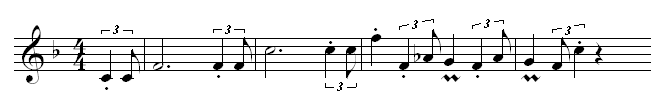

Opening bars of melody line of "The Toy Trumpet"

In 1939, Scott made his Quintette into a big band. When he was named music director by CBS radio three years later, he organized the first racially integrated radio band. During the next two years, he hired saxophonist Ben Webster, trumpeter Charlie Shavers, bassist Billy Taylor, trumpeter Emmett Berry, trombonist Benny Morton, and drummer Cozy Cole. In 1942, Scott relinquished his keyboard duties so he could concentrate on hiring, composing, arranging, and conducting. He resumed playing keyboard with some of his bands.

In 1941, he directed a 13-piece orchestra to produce what he termed "silent music" in New York, making a great show of performing with very little sound. This was one of the earliest performances of the silent or near-silent music canon.

== Middle career ==
After serving as music director for programs Broadway Bandbox from 1942 to 1944, Scott quit the network. He composed and arranged music (with lyrics by Bernie Hanighen) for the 1946 Broadway musical Lute Song starring Mary Martin and Yul Brynner.

During the late 1940s, contemporaneous with guitarist Les Paul's studio work with Mary Ford, Scott began recording pop songs using the layered multi-tracked vocals of his second wife, singer Dorothy Collins. A number of these were released commercially, but the technique failed to earn him the chart success of Les Paul and Mary Ford.

In 1948, Scott formed a six-man "quintet" which served for several months as house band for the CBS radio program Herb Shriner Time. The group made studio recordings, some of which were released with Scott's short-lived Master Records label. This was not the Irving Mills-owned brand of the same name; Scott allegedly named his brandname in tribute to the defunct Mills enterprise.

When his brother Mark Warnow died in 1949, Scott succeeded him as orchestra director for the CBS Radio show Your Hit Parade . During the next year, the show moved to NBC Television, and Scott continued to director the orchestra until 1957. Collins was a featured singer on Your Hit Parade. The job paid well, but Scott considered it strictly a "rent gig" and used his salary to finance his electronic music research more privately.

In 1950, Scott composed his first—and only known—classical work, entitled Suite for Violin and Piano. The five-movement suite was performed at Carnegie Hall on February 7, 1950, by violinist Arnold Eidus and pianist Carlo Bussotti, who recorded the work.)

In 1958, while serving as an A&R director for Everest, Scott produced singer Gloria Lynne's album Miss Gloria Lynne. The sidemen included many of the same session players (e.g., Milt Hinton, Sam Taylor, George Duvivier, Harry "Sweets" Edison, Eddie Costa, Kenny Burrell, Wild Bill Davis) who participated in Scott's 1959 Secret 7 recording project.

== Electronics and research ==
Scott, who attended Brooklyn Technical High School, was an electronic music pioneer and adventurous audio engineer. During the 1930s and 1940s, many of his band's recording sessions found the bandleader in the control room, monitoring and adjusting the acoustics, often by novel means. As Gert-Jan Blom and Jeff Winner wrote, "Scott sought to master all aspects of sound capture and manipulation. His special interest in the technical aspects of recording, combined with the state-of-the-art facilities at his disposal, provided him with enormous hands-on experience as an engineer."

In 1946, Scott established Manhattan Research Incorporated. As well as designing electronic audio devices for personal use, over the years Scott sold and supported a number of related projects, including components such as ring modulators, wave, tone, and envelope shapers, modulators, and filters. Of interest were the "keyboard theremin", "chromatic electronic drum generators", and "circle generators". Scott described Manhattan Research as "More than a think factory—a dream center where the excitement of tomorrow is made available today." Robert Moog met Scott in the 1950s, designed circuits for him in the 1960s, and considered him an important influence.

Relying on several instruments of his own invention, such as the Clavivox (adapted from a Moog theremin) and Electronium, Scott recorded futuristic electronic compositions for use in television and radio commercials and records of electronic music. A series of three albums designed to lull infants to sleep, his work Soothing Sounds for Baby was released in 1964 with the Gesell Institute of Child Development. The public showed little interest in it. But Manhattan Research provided ear-catching sonic textures for commercials.

Scott developed some of the first devices capable of producing a series of electronic tones automatically in sequence. He credited himself as the inventor of the polyphonic sequencer. His electromechanical devices, some with motors moving photocells past lights, bore little resemblance to the all-electronic sequencers of the late Sixties. He began working on a machine he said could compose by artificial intelligence. The Electronium is considered the first synthesizer capable of algorithmic composition.

Some of Raymond Scott's projects were less complex but still ambitious. During the 1950s and 1960s, he developed and patented electronic telephone ringers, alarms, chimes, and sirens, vending machines, and ashtrays with accompanying electronic music scores, an electronic musical baby rattle, and an adult toy that produced varying sounds depending on how two people touched each another. He believed these devices would "electronically update the many sounds around us – the functional sounds".

While these devices foreshadowed the future of electronic music, they were not successful commercially. As Mark Brend wrote at Reverb.com:

Hindsight reveals Scott as more ideas-man than business-man. Glossy brochures advertised a dizzying array of his inventions: electronic doorbells, multitrack tape recorders, rhythm machines, sequencers, and instruments such as the Clavivox, a kind of keyboard theremin. But these rarely sold. It's possible that didn't bother Scott too much, as through the '50s he was still earning well from the first phase of his career and had a new income stream composing electronic jingles—for Sprite, Nescafé, and Baltimore Gas and Electric Company, among others.

Scott and Dorothy Collins divorced in 1964, and in 1967 he married Mitzi Curtis (1918–2012). During the second half of the 1960s, he became isolated and secretive about his inventions; he gave few interviews, made no public presentations, and released no records. In 1966–67, Scott (using the screen credit "Ramond Scott") composed and recorded electronic music soundtracks for experimental movies by Muppets creator Jim Henson.

During his big band period, Scott endured tense relationships with musicians he employed. But when his career became immersed in electronic gadgetry, he preferred the company of technicians, such as Moog, Herb Deutsch, Tom Rhea, and Alan Entenmann. Scott welcomed curious visitors to his lab, among them French electronic music pioneer Jean-Jacques Perrey in March 1960.

== Motown years ==
In 1969, Berry Gordy of Motown visited Scott to witness the Electronium in action. Impressed by the possibilities, Gordy hired Scott in 1971 as director of Motown's electronic music and research department in Los Angeles, a job Scott had until 1977. No Motown recordings using Scott's electronic inventions have yet been identified publicly. Guy Costa, Head of Operations and Chief Engineer at Motown from 1969 to 1987, said about Scott's hiring:

He started originally working [on the Electronium] out of Berry's house. They set up a room over the garages, and he worked there putting stuff together so Berry could get involved and see the progress. At one point Scott worked out of a studio. The unit never really got finalized—Ray had a real problem letting go. It was always being developed. That was a problem for Berry. He wanted instant gratification. Eventually his interest started to wane after a period of probably two or three years. Finally Ray took the thing down to his house and kept working on it. Berry kind of lost interest. He was off doing Diana Ross movies.

Scott later said he "spent 11 years and close to a million dollars developing the Electronium." After leaving Motown he was mostly unemployed, though hardly inactive. He continued to modify his inventions, adapting computers and primitive MIDI devices to his systems. He suffered a series of heart attacks, ran low on cash, and became a subject on Where Are They Now?.

Largely forgotten by the public by the 1980s, he suffered a stroke in 1987 that left him unable to work or engage in conversation.

== Secret Seven ==
In 1959, Scott organized a band of top-tier jazz session musicians and recorded an album entitled The Unexpected, credited to the Secret Seven, and released on the Top Rank label. Musicians performing on the album included Sam “The Man” Taylor, Harry “Sweets” Edison, Wild Bill Davis, Milt Hinton, Elvin Jones, Toots Thielemans, and Kenny Burrell, as well as Scott's then-wife Dorthy Collins.

== Animation ==
In 1943, Scott sold his music publishing to Warner Bros., who allowed Carl Stalling, music director for Looney Tunes and Merrie Melodies, to adapt any composition, including Scott's, in the Warner music catalog.

Stalling began adding Scott quotes to his cartoon scores, such as in The Great Piggy Bank Robbery. Scott's tunes have been licensed to The Simpsons, The Ren & Stimpy Show, Animaniacs, The Oblongs, Batfink, SpongeBob SquarePants, and Duckman. "Powerhouse" was quoted ten times in the Warner Brothers feature Looney Tunes: Back in Action (2003). Scott's estate was notorious for being difficult to negotiate with for licensing, with Nickelodeon and Spümcø taking a whole year to gain approval for the use of Scott's tracks in The Ren & Stimpy Show. Said episodes were unavailable on Paramount+ due to this issue.

== Obscurity and rediscovery ==
Interest in Scott's work was revived during the early 1990s, after music journalist Irwin Chusid met Raymond and his wife Mitzi at their home in California and discovered a collection of unreleased recordings. In 1992, the release of Reckless Nights and Turkish Twilights by Columbia, produced by Chusid with Hal Willner as executive producer, was the first major-label compilation by his 1937–39 six-man quintet. A year earlier, Chusid and Will Friedwald produced an album of quintet broadcasts titled The Man Who Made Cartoons Swing for Stash. The director of The Ren & Stimpy Show, John Kricfalusi, began using quintet recordings. During the late-1990s, The Beau Hunks, a Dutch ensemble that performed music written by Leroy Shield for Laurel and Hardy movies, released two albums of music by Scott's sextet: Celebration on the Planet Mars and Manhattan Minuet (both released by Basta Audio-Visuals). Members of The Beau Hunks (reconfigured as a "Saxtet", then a "Soctette") performed and recorded Scott works, sometimes in collaboration with the Metropole Orkest.

The posthumously released Manhattan Research Inc. (Basta, 2000, co-produced by Gert-Jan Blom and Jeff Winner) showcases Scott's pioneering electronic works from the 1950s and 1960s on two CDs (the package includes a 144-page hardcover book). Microphone Music (Basta, 2002, produced by Irwin Chusid with Blom and Winner as project advisors), explores the original Scott Quintette's work. The 2008 CD release Ectoplasm (Basta) chronicles a second (1948–49) incarnation of the six-man "quintet" format, with Scott's wife Dorothy Collins singing on several tracks. In June 2017, Basta issued a 3-LP/2-CD set entitled Three Willow Park: Electronic Music from Inner Space, featuring 61 unreleased electronic recordings made by Scott between 1961 and 1971 (Basta, 2017, produced by Gert-Jan Blom, Irwin Chusid, and Jeff Winner). AllMusic named the set one of the "Best Compilations of 2017".

Mark Mothersbaugh, through his production company Mutato Muzika, purchased Scott's only (non-functioning) Electronium in 1996 with the intention of restoring it.

J Dilla sampled "Lightworks" and "Bendix 1: The Tomorrow People" for the track "Lightworks" and "Sprite: Melonball Bounce" for the track "Workinonit" on his final album Donuts.

In 2023, Scott received a posthumous Grammy Award nomination in the Best Instrumental Composition category for "Cutey and the Dragon." The work was begun on paper by Scott in 1982 and completed in 2022 by Gordon Goodwin (who also received a nomination as co-composer). Its debut recording appears on the 2023 album Raymond Scott Reimagined by Quartet San Francisco, Gordon Goodwin's Big Phat Band, and Take 6.

== Death ==
On February 8, 1994, Scott died of pneumonia in North Hills, Los Angeles, aged 85.

== Films and television ==
In addition to Warner Brothers cartoons (which were intended for theatrical screening), the following movies include recordings or works composed or co-composed by Scott: Nothing Sacred (1937, various adapted standards); Ali Baba Goes to Town (1938, "Twilight in Turkey" and "Arabania"); Happy Landing (1938, "War Dance for Wooden Indians"); Rebecca of Sunnybrook Farm (1938, "The Toy Trumpet"; with special lyrics by Jack Lawrence); Just Around the Corner (1938, "Brass Buttons and Epaulettes" [performed by Scott's Quintette, but not composed by Scott]); Sally, Irene and Mary (1938, "Minuet in Jazz"); Bells of Rosarita (1945, "Singing Down the Road"); Not Wanted (1949, theme and orchestrations); The West Point Story (1950, "The Toy Trumpet"); Storm Warning (1951, "Dinner Music for a Pack of Hungry Cannibals"); The Trouble with Harry (1955, "Flagging the Train to Tuscaloosa"; words by Mack David); Never Love a Stranger (1958, score); The Pusher (1960, score); Clean and Sober (1988, "Singing Down the Road"); Honey, I Shrunk the Kids (1989, "Powerhouse" [uncredited, affirmed in out-of-court settlement]); Search and Destroy (1995, "Moment Whimsical"); Funny Bones (1995, "The Penguin"); Lulu on the Bridge (1998, "Devil Drums"); Looney Tunes: Back in Action (2003, "Powerhouse"); Starsky and Hutch (2005, "Dinner Music for Pack of Hungry Cannibals"); RocknRolla (2008, "Powerhouse"); Best of Enemies (2015, "Portofino"); The Space Between Us (2017, "Song of India"); and Won't You Be My Neighbor (2018, "Waltz of the Diddles").

In April 2021, Scott's "Powerhouse" was used for the CBS television show Young Sheldon, in the opening scene of the episode "Mitch's Son and the Unconditional Approval of a Government Agency" (season 4, ep. 14).

Scott's son, movie editor Stan Warnow, released the documentary Deconstructing Dad: The Music, Machines and Mystery of Raymond Scott in 2010.

== Theater ==
- Lute Song (1946) – musical – composer and orchestrator; the production included "Mountain High, Valley Low" with lyrics by Bernard Hanighen
- Peep Show (1950) – produced by Mike Todd, composed "Desire" to accompany the "Cat Girl" dance routine
- Powerhouse (2009) – produced by Sinking Ship Productions, written by Josh Luxenberg and directed by Jonathan Levin and first staged during the New York International Fringe Festival, is an impressionistic play based on Scott's life and work, choreographed with his music and recordings. It returned to the stage in 2014 for a three-week run at New York's New Ohio Theater.
- Manhattan Research, which premiered at Lincoln Center Out of Doors in August 2013, is a dance work set to Raymond Scott's music, choreographed by John Heginbotham.

== Discography ==
- Raymond Scott - Raymond Scott (Columbia, 1947)
- Raymond Scott and His Orchestra Play (MGM, 1953)
- A Yank in Europe – Ted Heath and his Music play Raymond Scott compositions (1956)
- This Time With Strings (Coral, 1957)
- Rock 'n Roll Symphony (Everest, 1958)
- Manhattan Research, Inc. (Columbia, 1959)
- The Secret 7: The Unexpected (Top Rank, 1960)
- Soothing Sounds for Baby volumes 1–3 (Epic, 1963)
- The Raymond Scott Project: Vol. 1: Powerhouse (Stash, 1991)
- The Music of Raymond Scott: Reckless Nights and Turkish Twilights (Columbia, 1992)
- Manhattan Research, Inc. (Basta Music, 2000)
- Microphone Music (Basta Music, 2002)
- Ectoplasm (Basta Music, 2008)
- Suite for Violin and Piano (Basta Music, 2012)
- Raymond Scott Songbook (Li'l Daisy / Daisyworld, 2013)
- Raymond Scott Rewired (Basta Music, 2014)
- Three Willow Park: Electronic Music from Inner Space (Basta Music, 2017)
- The Jingle Workshop: Midcentury Musical Miniatures 1951-1965 (Modern Harmonic, 2019)

== Bibliography ==
- Bloom, Ken. American Song. The Complete Musical Theater Companion. 1877–1995. Vol. 2, 2nd edition, Schirmer Books, 1996
- Chusid, Irwin and Jeff Winner, eds., Raymond Scott: Artifacts from the Archives, a 349-page e-publication of selected Scott electronic music ephemera from the archives of the University of Missouri, Kansas City
- Goldmark, Daniel, and Yuval Taylor, eds. The Cartoon Music Book (Chicago Review Press; 2002), ISBN 1-55652-473-0, ISBN 978-1-55652-473-8. Includes chapter by Irwin Chusid on how Scott's music has been adapted for cartoons
- Holmes, Thom (2008). "Early Synthesizers and Experimenters". Electronic and Experimental Music: Technology, Music, and Culture (3rd ed.). Taylor & Francis. ISBN 978-0-415-95781-6.
- Kernfeld, Barry Dean, ed. The New Grove Dictionary of Jazz, Macmillan, 1988
- Larkin, Colin. The Encyclopedia of Popular Music, 3rd edition, Macmillan, 1998
- Press, Jaques Cattell, ed. ASCAP Biographical Dictionary of Composers, Authors and Publishers, 4th edition, R. R. Bowker, 1980
