= Gesell Developmental Schedules =

Developmental stages in young children

The Gesell Developmental Schedules are a set of developmental metrics which outline the ages & stages of development in young children developed by Dr. Arnold Gesell and colleagues. The original scale is generally considered not to satisfy the standards of rigor currently accepted in the field of psychometrics and is no longer used as an evaluative rubric in the clinical context. The most current form of the schedules comes from the Gesell Institute of Child Development and is known as the Gesell Developmental Observation-Revised for ages 2 1/2 to 9 years. This assessment uses the principles of the schedules to determine the developmental age & stage of an any given child.

== History ==
The Gesell Developmental Schedule was first published in 1925. The original scale was based on the normative data that was collected from a carefully conducted longitudinal study of early human development. The study focused on the various stages of developing and how they unfolded over time. Throughout the years, it has been subjected to extensive research and has subsequently been refined and updated. The first revision was published in 1940. When Dr. Gesell retired from Yale in 1950, Yale retained ownership of the birth to age 3 schedules and Yale continued to refine them although they were never republished named as Gesell Schedules. The schedules for older children became the property of Gesell Institute of Child Development which was established in 1950. In 1964 Dr. Francis Ilg and Dr. Louise Bates Ames, the founders of the Gesell Institute, refined, revised, and collected data on children 5–10 years of age and subsequently in 1965, 1972, and 1979. The results were published in School Readiness: Behavior Tests used at the Gesell Institute. In 2011, the instrument was revised and data was collected only on ages 3–6 years. Today, it is one of the oldest and most established intelligence measures of young children. Once the leading infant intelligence measure from the 1930s through the 1960s, the Gesell Developmental Schedule was nothing short of a breakthrough in infant ability testing when it was first constructed- the first of its kind, actually.

In March 2010, the Gesell Institute completed a three-year nationwide study which included some 1,300 assessments of children ages 2 years 9 months to 6 years 3 months. The study included a sample of public, private, urban, and suburban schools, 55 sites spanning 23 US states participated in the study. As a result, Gesell Institute published the Gesell Developmental Observation-Revised (GDO-R). The GDO-R is a comprehensive multi-dimensional assessment system that assists educators, and other professionals in understanding characteristics of child behavior in relation to typical growth patterns between 2 1/2 and 9 years of age.

The GDO-R uses direct observation to evaluate a child's cognitive, language, motor and social-emotional responses in five strands: Developmental, Letter/Numbers, Language/Comprehension, Visual/Spatial, and Social/Emotional/Adaptive. A child's performance on each strand corresponds to a Performance Level Rating (Age Appropriate, Emerging or Concern) and a Developmental Age. Developmental Age, determined by calculating the results of the GDO-R, is an age in years and half-years that best describes a child's behavior and performance on a developmental scale. It may be equal to, older, or younger than the child's actual chronological age. It encompasses a child's social, emotional, intellectual and physical make up.

The GDO-R meets requirements for both Head Start (§ 1304.20) and Section 614 of IDEA (Individuals with Disabilities Education Act).

== Validity ==
The Gesell Developmental Observation-Revised (GDO-R) Technical Report is the first comprehensive technical publication for the GDO assessment instrument since 1979. The report is intended for both teachers and administrators. Its ultimate purpose is helping to inform curriculum development. It is based on a sample of assessment data for developmental and achievement tasks for children in preschool and Kindergarten. Readers of this Technical Report should possess an advanced understanding of appropriate use and application of assessment tools, methods for conducting test development and methodology in statistics and measurement.

== Conclusion ==
Gesell Institute gathered new data in 2008–2010 to validate the use of the Gesell Developmental Observation-Revised in today's classrooms. The data and tests of reliability and validity support the use of the new instrument for the purpose of monitoring child growth and behavior. The newest scale does provide an updated and improved screening instrument. While the assessment does not predict future intelligence, it can obtain an early estimate of possible mental retardation.

== The Original Scale ==
The Gesell Developmental Schedules claimed that an appraisal of the developmental status of infants and young children could be made. The Gesell Developmental Schedule believes that human development unfolds in stages, or in sequences over a given time period. These stages were considered milestones, or the manifestations of mental development. Some examples are:

- "When the infant first rolls from back to stomach unassisted"
- "When the child first utters words"
- "When the child learns to walk"

The Gesell Developmental Schedule was then able to compare the infant or child's rate of development to a norm that was derived from a previous longitudinal study (see history, above). Accordingly, the scale would purportedly be able to show that infants and young children who demonstrate behaviors or responses more typical of an older chronological age would have higher intelligence.

Additionally, the Gesell Developmental Schedule has moved beyond merely identifying high-intelligence children and has become a research tool. Researchers use the scale today to assess infant intellectual development after:

- "Exposure to mercury"
- "Diagnoses of abnormal brain formation"
- "In utero diagnoses of hyperthyroidism"
- "In assessing infants with autism"

Further, the scale does seem to assist in revealing subtle deficits in infants that may occur.

The Gesell Development Schedule operates off what is known as an individual's developmental quotient, or otherwise known as DQ. The DQ is determined according to the scores of the test and is evaluated by ascertaining whether or not the infant or child is displaying the appropriate behavior for the age (The individual's developmental quotient is a parallel to the mental age (MA) concept). In turn, The DA(development age) is used as part of an IQ formula:

$\text{DQ} = \frac{\text{Development Age}}{\text{Chronological Age}} \times 100$

or

$\text{DQ} = \frac{\text{DA}}{\text{CA}} \times 100$

== Drawbacks ==
Although the original Gesell Development Schedule has had many years of extensive use and much revision, the scale suffered from many psychometric weaknesses, and has fallen short of the acceptable standards of psychometrics today. As a result, interest in and use of the scale has fallen over the years.

The first issue with the original scale was that the standardization sample was quite inadequate. Secondly, there was no evidence of reliability or validity in the test manual. Third, the test directions were sometimes vague and scoring procedures questionable.
