= Maturationism =

Educational philosophy

Maturationism is an early childhood educational philosophy that sees the child as a growing organism and believes that the role of education is to passively support this growth rather than actively fill the child with information. This theory suggests that growth and development unfold from within the organism. It is also based on the idea that a learner's development is governed by a biologically based schedule.

== Theory ==
In maturationism, genetic factors play a larger role in development than environmental ones, particularly in regard to language acquisition. Here, the effect of genetic inheritance to development has more bearing than the impact of nurture, experience, and learning. It is believed that an innate maturational schedule drives what a child will do and at what time.

Maturationism is associated with the concept of developmental stages. Maturation theorists maintain that the universal and invariant sequence of human development can be described and that the genetic makeup of an individual determines the pace of such development. It is often associated with the work of Arnold Gesell who, along with his colleagues at the Clinic of Child Development at Yale University, charted the development of thousands of children and described developmental milestones that were achieved in a developmental sequence.

== Maturation programs ==
Learning programs based on the maturationist perspective usually focus on certain tenets of psychodynamic theories of development and progressive educational philosophy. These draw, for instance, from the work of Sigmund Freud as reflected in their emphasis on early experience for subsequent emotional, social, and cognitive development. The objectives are also stated in global, qualitative terms and often associated to the development of competency and self-esteem, factors that are considered crucial in cognitive and social development.
