= Michael Pichichero =

American scientist

Michael E. Pichichero
- Education: University of Rochester School of Medicine
- Known for: Thimerosal controversy
- Awards: Breese Award for Outstanding Contribution to Clinical Research, Teaching and Practice, 2005
- Scientific career
- Fields: Pediatrics, toxicology
- Workplaces: University of Rochester Medical Center, Rochester General Hospital Research Institute

Michael E. Pichichero is an American physician who is the Director of the Rochester General Hospital Research Institute, a Research Professor at Rochester Institute of Technology and a clinical professor in the Department of Pediatrics at the University of Rochester Medical Center. He is the author of a number of scientific studies regarding the safety of thimerosal as a preservative in vaccines.

== Biography ==
Pichichero received his undergraduate degree from Rutgers University, and his medical degree from the University of Rochester. He did post graduate training at the University of Colorado, Denver. He completed fellowships in Pediatric Infectious Diseases and Adult and Pediatric Allergy and Immunology at the University of Rochester, NY.

== Scientific career ==
Pichichero's studies say that ethylmercury, the metabolite of thimerosal, is rapidly metabolized and excreted after administration of thimerosal-containing vaccines, as well as that administration thereof does not raise blood mercury levels above the EPA's lower limit. In addition, his research has concluded that ethylmercury is metabolized about six times as fast as methylmercury (the kind of mercury found in fish), and that the former has a blood half-life of about 3.7 days whereas the latter has a half-life of 44 days. His research says that after children receive a vaccine with thimerosal in it, their blood mercury levels return to normal within only a month.

Pichichero has written a textbook about streptococcal pharyngitis. A board-certified immunologist, he was on the team of scientists at the University of Rochester who invented the Hib vaccine. His more recent research, however, has focused on ear infections and their treatment with antibiotics.

== Selected publications ==
- Pichichero, M. E.; Pichichero, D. M. (1998). "Diagnosis of penicillin, amoxicillin, and cephalosporin allergy: Reliability of examination assessed by skin testing and oral challenge". The Journal of Pediatrics. 132 (1): 137–143. doi:10.1016/s0022-3476(98)70499-8. PMID 9470015.
- Pichichero, M. E. (2005). "A Review of Evidence Supporting the American Academy of Pediatrics Recommendation for Prescribing Cephalosporin Antibiotics for Penicillin-Allergic Patients". Pediatrics. 115 (4): 1048–1057. doi:10.1542/peds.2004-1276. PMID 15805383. S2CID 21246804.
- Kaur, R.; Adlowitz, D. G.; Casey, J. R.; Zeng, M.; Pichichero, M. E. (2010). "Simultaneous Assay for Four Bacterial Species Including Alloiococcus otitidis Using Multiplex-PCR in Children with Culture Negative Acute Otitis Media". The Pediatric Infectious Disease Journal. 29 (8): 741–745. doi:10.1097/INF.0b013e3181d9e639. PMC 3581301. PMID 20335823.
