= Electronium =

Early electronic music synthesizer

The Electronium, created by Raymond Scott, is an early combined electronic synthesizer and algorithmic composition / generative music machine.

Its place in history is unusual, because while in intention it is analogous to the digital algorithmic composition systems that would follow it, it was implemented entirely as an analog electronic machine.

== History ==
Development was begun in 1959, with a workable unit by 1969. Scott, however, never ceased to modify and further develop the device by the time of his death in 1994.

It was one of the very few electronic creations of Scott to be sold to a customer, as he was normally highly secretive about his devices. A single Electronium machine was sold to Motown Records, following a 1969 meeting between Scott and Motown's Berry Gordy. The initial contract required that Scott visited Motown for three months to teach staff how the machine is used. This culminated in the 1971 hiring of Scott to serve as director of Motown's electronic music and research department in Los Angeles, California, a position that Scott held until 1977. No Motown recordings using Scott's electronic inventions have yet been publicly identified.

Guy Costa, Head of Operations and Chief Engineer at Motown from 1969 to 1987, said about Scott's hiring:

He started originally working [on the Electronium] out of Berry's house. They set up a room over the garages, and he worked there putting stuff together so Berry could get involved and see the progress. At one point Scott worked out of a studio. The unit never really got finalized — Ray had a real problem letting go. It was always being developed. That was a problem for Berry. He wanted instant gratification. Eventually his interest started to wane after a period of probably two or three years. Finally Ray took the thing down to his house and kept working on it. Berry kind of lost interest. He was off doing Diana Ross movies.

Scott later said he "spent 11 years and close to a million dollars developing the Electronium."

Much remains to be discovered about the machine's functionality, since detailed documentation on its workings are not currently available, and the single remaining machine is not in working order.

In a patent application, Scott wrote that "The entire system is based on the concept of Artistic Collaboration Between Man and Machine, (…) The new structures being directed into the machine are unpredictable in their details, and hence the results are a kind of duet between the composer and the machine."

Adding to the difficulty of defining what the Electronium was and how it worked is the fact that it was never finished. Scott continued to develop it during his employment at Motown, and after his dismissal there he carried on working on the machine, stopping only when his deteriorating health abruptly halted him from carrying on, after his first of several strokes.

The Electronium is currently owned by Devo's co-founder and lead singer Mark Mothersbaugh, who has initiated efforts towards its restoration. In 2017, Brian Kehew began working on the restoration of the Electronium, in an effort partially financed by Gotye.

== See also ==
- Electronic musical instrument
