= Clavivox =

Electronic sound synthesizer and sequencer

The Clavivox was a keyboard sound synthesizer and sequencer developed by American composer Raymond Scott.

== History ==
Scott had earlier built a theremin as a toy for his daughter Carrie, and began developing the Clavivox, or "keyboard theremin," in 1952. In 1956, he purchased an R.A. Moog Model 305 theremin from a young Bob Moog and incorporated its sound generator as part of a prototype Clavivox. Scott's instrument allowed the use of portamento over a 3-octave range, which made it possible for the player to control the synthesizer via a keyboard, but with additional glide, giving it a "human" quality. Additionally, Scott's design added amplitude envelopes, vibrato and other effects. Scott applied for a patent in December 1956 and was granted U.S. patent 2,871,745 on Feb. 3, 1959.

"A lot of the sound-producing circuitry of the Clavivox resembled very closely the first analog synthesizer my company made in the mid-'60s," Moog explained years later. "Some of the sounds are not the same, but they're close."

Later Clavivox models used light shining through photographic film onto photocells as a source of control voltage to control pitch and timbre.

== See also ==
- ANS synthesizer
- Sound synthesis
