= James F. Leckman =

American child psychiatrist and psychoanalyst

James Frederick Leckman is an American child psychiatrist and psychoanalyst and the Neison Harris Professor of Child Psychiatry, Psychiatry, Psychology and Pediatrics at the Yale School of Medicine, recognized for his research in Tourette syndrome (TS) and obsessive–compulsive disorder (OCD).

== Personal life and education ==
Leckman obtained degrees in chemistry and philosophy from the College of Wooster in 1969, and his MD from the University of New Mexico School of Medicine in 1973. He obtained his PhD in clinical science from the University of São Paulo in 2014.

Leckman is married to Hannah Hone Leckman; they have two children.

== Career ==
After interning in San Francisco at the United States Public Health Service Marine Hospital for two years (1973–1974), Leckman worked at the National Institute of Mental Health (NIMH) in adult psychiatry (1974–1976), before completing his residency in psychiatry at Yale School of Medicine in 1979.

At Yale since 1979, he took several sabbaticals to study elsewhere, including a 1998 study of animal behavior at the University of Cambridge. He was Director of Research for the Yale Child Study Center (1983–2010), where his interests include the study of the interplay between genetic and epigenetic factors in human development and Darwinism in psychopathology.

Leckman is an international leader in Tourette syndrome research, and as of 2025, was the highest publisher on the topic. His 1998 paper "Course of tic severity in Tourette syndrome: the first two decades" was among the top four most influential papers on TS as of 2025. By July 2018, his 1995 family study on obsessive–compulsive disorder was the second most cited article on the disorder.

Siying et al wrote in 2025 that he was responsible for "shaping key insights" with studies that "significantly advanced our understanding of the genetic and environmental factors influencing TS". He is frequently named as one of America's best doctors by peers. According to a profile of featured researchers by the then-named Mental Health Research Association (NARSAD):

Very few people have the clinical, research and teaching experience, the empathy for the human condition, and the curiosity Dr. Leckman has to explore such a fundamental question as human attachment. He is a world-renowned child psychiatrist and patient-oriented clinical investigator with unique expertise in the evaluation of Tourette's syndrome and early-onset obsessive-compulsive disorder.

== Appointments, awards, affiliations and recognition ==
Leckman served as an associate editor for the Journal of Child Psychology and Psychiatry. He has received the following awards and recognition:

- Blanche E. Ittleson Award for Research in Child Psychiatry, 1995, from the American Psychiatric Association.
- Outstanding Research Mentor, awarded five times, from the American Academy of Child and Adolescent Psychiatry.
- Fellows of the American Psychiatric Association, American Academy of Child Adolescent Psychology, and American College of Neuropsychopharmacology.
- Member of the American College of Psychiatrists since 1991.
- Distinguished alumni award, College of Wooster.

== Publications ==
Leckman had authored or co-authored more than 250 professional articles and 115 book chapters as of 2005, and was the author of seven books as of 2012. In 2002, he was named a "Highly Cited Researcher" by the American Society for Information Science and Technology.

A 2025 bibliometric analysis of 4,011 publications between 1960 and 2024 on Tourette syndrome found that Leckman had the highest h-index (58) of the 12,860 authors involved.

Leckman's books include:

- Tourette's Syndrome -- Tics, Obsessions, Compulsions: Developmental Psychopathology and Clinical Care, 2001, ISBN 978-0471113751
- Pediatric Psychopharmacology: Principles and Practice, 2002, ISBN 978-0195141733
- Tourette's Syndrome and Tic Disorders: Clinical Understanding and Treatment, 1988, ISBN 978-0471629245
