= Arnold Gesell =

American psychologist and pediatrician (1880–1961)

- Born: Arnold Lucius Gesell; 21 June 1880; Alma, Wisconsin
- Died: 29 May 1961 (aged 80); New Haven, Connecticut
- Education: University of Wisconsin–Stevens Point; University of Wisconsin—Madison; Yale University; Clark University
- Known for: Studies in child development
- Scientific career
- Fields: Clinical Psychology
- Workplaces: Yale Child Study Center (Founder), Yale University

Arnold Lucius Gesell (21 June 1880 – 29 May 1961) was an American psychologist, pediatrician and professor at Yale University known for his research and contributions to the fields of child hygiene and child development.

== Early life ==
Gesell was born in Alma, Wisconsin, and later wrote an article analyzing his experiences there entitled "The Village of a Thousand Souls". The eldest of five children, Arnold and his siblings were born to photographer Gerhard Gesell and schoolteacher Christine Giesen. His first experience in observing child development involved watching his younger siblings learn and grow until he graduated from high school in 1896.

After high school, Gesell attended Stevens Point Normal School, where a course taught by Edgar James Swift led Arnold to take an interest in psychology. Gesell worked as a high school teacher briefly before leaving to study at the University of Wisconsin. Later, he studied history under Frederick Jackson Turner and psychology under Joseph Jastrow, receiving a bachelor of philosophy degree from Wisconsin in 1903.

== Career ==
Gesell served as a teacher and high school principal before seeking his psychological doctorate at Clark University, where the university's president, G. Stanley Hall, had founded the child study movement. Arnold received his Ph.D. from Clark in 1906.

Gesell worked at several educational facilities in New York City and Wisconsin before obtaining a professorship at the Los Angeles State Normal School, now known as the University of California, Los Angeles. There he met fellow teacher Beatrice Chandler, who would become his wife. They had a daughter and a son, Federal District Judge Gerhard Gesell.

Gesell also spent time at schools for the mentally disabled, including the Vineland Training School in New Jersey. Having developed an interest in the causes and treatment of childhood disabilities, Gesell began studying at the University of Wisconsin Medical School in 1910 to better understand physiology. He accepted a position as assistant professor at Yale University in 1911, where he also continued to study medicine. He developed the Clinic of Child Development there and received his MD in 1915. He was later given a full professorship at Yale.

Gesell also served as the school psychologist for the Connecticut State Board of Education and helped develop classes to help children with disabilities succeed. This historic appointment made Gesell the first school psychologist in the United States. He wrote several books, including The Preschool Child from the Standpoint of Public Hygiene and Education in 1923, The Mental Growth of the Preschool Child in 1925 (which was also published as a film), and An Atlas of Infant Behavior (chronicling typical milestones for certain ages) in 1934. He coauthored with Frances Ilg two childrearing guides, Infant and Child in the Culture of Today in 1943 and The Child from Five to Ten in 1946.

Gesell made use of the latest technology in his research. He used the newest in video and photography advancements. He also made use of one-way mirrors when observing children, even inventing the Gesell dome, a one-way mirror shaped like a dome under which children could be observed without being disturbed. In his research, he studied many children, including Kamala, a feral child. He also did research on young animals, including monkeys.

As a psychologist, Gesell wrote and spoke about the importance of both nature and nurture in child development. He cautioned others not to be quick to attribute mental disabilities to specific causes. He believed that many aspects of human behavior, such as handedness and temperament, were heritable. He explained that children adapted to their parents as well as to one another. He advocated for a nationwide nursery school system in the United States.

Gesell's popular books spread his ideas beyond academia. His core message, urging parents to "nourish the child's trustfulness in life", resonated with child advocates long before Benjamin Spock became America's most prominent parental advisor. In The Child from Five to Ten, Gesell wrote, "It is no longer trite to say that children are the one remaining hope of mankind... If we could but capture their transparent honesty and sincerities! They still have much to teach us, if we observe closely enough."

== Maturational theory and developmental schedules ==
Gesell's ideas came to be known as Gesell's Maturational Theory of child development. Based on his theory, he published a series of summaries of child development sequences, called the Gesell Developmental Schedules.

The Gesell Institute of Human Development, named after him, was started by his colleagues from the Clinic of Child Development, Frances Ilg and Louise Bates Ames in 1950, after Gesell retired from the university in 1948. In 2012, the institute was renamed the Gesell Institute of Child Development.

== Personal ==
In 1911, Gesell married Beatrice Chandler who was a teacher he had met while working at Los Angeles State Normal School. The couple had a daughter and a son. Gesell died at his home in New Haven in 1961.

== Selected works ==
- Gesell, Arnold. "The Village of a Thousand Souls". American Magazine, October 1913, pp. 11–16.
- Gesell, Arnold. The Preschool Child from the Standpoint of Public Hygiene and Education. 1923.
- Gesell, Arnold. The Mental Growth of the Preschool Child. 1925.
- Gesell, Arnold. An Atlas of Infant Behavior. 1934.
- Gesell, Arnold. "Arnold Lucius Gesell" in Boring, E. G. History of Psychology in Autobiography 4: 123–42. Worcester, Massachusetts: Clark University Press, 1952.
- Gesell, Arnold & Ilg, Frances L. Infant and Child in the Culture of Today. 1943.
- Gesell, Arnold & Ilg, Frances L. The Child from Five to Ten. 1946.
- Gesell, Arnold & Ilg, Frances L. Child Development: An Introduction to the Study of Human Growth. New York: Harper. 194
- Gesell, Arnold, Ilg, Frances L., & Ames, L. B. Infant and Child in the Culture of Today: The Guidance of Development in Home and Nursery School (Rev. ed.). New York: Harper & Row, 1974.
- Gesell, Arnold, Thompson, H., & Amatruda, C. S. The Psychology of Early Growth, Including Norms of Infant Behavior and a Method of Genetic Analysis. New York: The Macmillan Company, 1938.
