= International Association for Child and Adolescent Psychiatry and Allied Professions =

- Abbreviation: IACAPAP
- Predecessor: International Committee for Child Psychiatry
- Formation: 1937
- Type: NGO
- Region served: Latin and North America, Pacific-Rim, Europe

The International Association for Child and Adolescent Psychiatry and Allied Professions (IACAPAP) is a non-governmental international association that advocates for the "promotion of the mental health and development of children and adolescents through policy, practice and research". Its membership is mainly Latin and North American, European, and Pacific Rim-based.

== History ==
In 1935, a group of practitioners in the new medical field of child psychiatry started work to establish and expand mutual contacts in spite of the social and political turmoil surrounding World War II. Two years later, they formed the "International Committee for Child Psychiatry". Georges Heuyer, the then head of the "Clinique annexe de neuropsychiatrie infantile" at the Salpêtrière in Paris, organized and chaired the first congress there, calling it the "Premier Congrès international de psychiatrie infantile, Paris, 24 juillet au 1er août 1937" ["First international conference on child psychiatry"].

The second international congress took place in London in 1948. During this meeting the international committee was renamed the "International Association for Child Psychiatry" (IACP) with about 30 national societies as members. All countries were to have access to IACP, however a credentials committee was set up to verify the qualifications of each applicant.

The name was changed again during the Lisbon congress of 1958, this time to the "International Association for Child Psychiatry and Allied Professions" (IACP&AP). At the 9th Congress (Melbourne, Australia, 1978) adolescents were incorporated in the official name: "The International Association for Child and Adolescent Psychiatry and Allied Professions" (IACAPAP).

In 1954, they incorporated as a tax-exempt organization in Massachusetts. Today, the IACAPAP is registered in Geneva, Switzerland, as a non-government organization (NGO) structured as a corporation and empowered as a juridical entity according to the Swiss Civil Code and the Constitution.

During the 1960s, Acta Paedopsychiatrica served as the IACAPAP's official scientific journal. The on-line journal, Adolescent Psychiatry and Mental Health is the official scientific journal of IACAPAP.

Donald J. Cohen became a vice-president of the IACAPAP in 1986, and was president from 1992–98. Its membership is global, but mainly North/Latin American, Asia-Pacific and Europe based, uniting many national organizations of child and adolescent psychiatry. Japan joined the organization in 1962. Until 1996, Tokyo hosted meetings of the regional Asian Society for Child and Adolescent Psychiatry and Allied Profession.

A world congress convenes every four years. At the 13th such congress in Dublin, Ireland, in 1982, Sherman F. Feinstein was the Adolescent Psychiatry Program Chairman. The 16th World Congress was held in Berlin in August 1994. The Secretary General as of 2000 was Ian M. Goodyer, a professor who founded the department of Child and Adolescent psychiatry at Cambridge University. The 19th Congress was held in Istanbul in 2008.
