= Yale Child Study Center =

Department at Yale University

The Yale Child Study Center is a department at the Yale University School of Medicine. The center conducts research and provides clinical services and medical training related to children and families. Topics of investigation include autism and related disorders, Tourette syndrome, other pediatric mental health concerns, parenting, and neurobiology.

== Mission ==
The center conducts research and provides clinical services and medical training related to children and families. Topics of investigation include autism spectrum disorders, Tourette syndrome, other pediatric mental health concerns, parenting, and neurobiology.

== History ==
The center was started in 1911 as the Yale Clinic of Child Development by Arnold Gesell. Dr. Gesell, who is considered the father of child development in the United States, led the center until 1948. Subsequent directors were:

- Milton J.E. Senn, 1948–1966
- Albert J. Solnit, 1966–1983
- Donald J. Cohen, 1983–2001
- John E. Schowalter, (interim) 2001–2002
- Alan E. Kazdin, 2002–2006
- Fred R. Volkmar, 2006–2014
- Linda C. Mayes, (interim) 2014–2016; 2016-present
