= Societal and cultural aspects of Tourette syndrome =

Societal and cultural aspects of Tourette syndrome include legal advocacy and health insurance issues, awareness of notable individuals with Tourette syndrome, and treatment of TS in the media and popular culture.

Tourette syndrome is an inherited neurological disorder with onset in childhood, characterized by the presence of motor and phonic tics. Tourette's is a misunderstood and stigmatized condition, often mentioned in the popular media. Tourette syndrome was once considered a rare and bizarre syndrome. It is no longer considered rare, but is often undetected, due to the wide range of severity, with most cases classified as mild. Tourette's is defined as part of a spectrum of tic disorders, which includes provisional and chronic tics. With increased knowledge of the full range of severity of Tourette syndrome—including milder cases—it has shifted from a condition only recognized in its most severe and impairing forms, to one recognized as a condition which is often mild, and which may be associated with some advantages and some disadvantages.

== Legal and insurance issues ==
There is no reason to believe that persons with Tourette's have diminished capacity in regards to understanding legal issues. Examples of federal legislation which protects some rights of individuals with TS in the United States include the Individuals with Disabilities Education Act (IDEA) and the Americans with Disabilities Act (ADA). Legal and other advocacy information regarding the challenges associated with TS can be found on the website of the Tourette Association of America.

A review of all cases tried in state and federal courts in the US between 1985 and 2003 (civil rights, criminal, education, family, labor, and social security) found that TS was implicated in only about 150 cases, 21 of which were criminal, over 18 years. The authors concluded that TS "rarely leads to criminal behavior, but patients with TS who have behavioral comorbidities are at risk of being involved with the legal system".

== Latent advantages ==
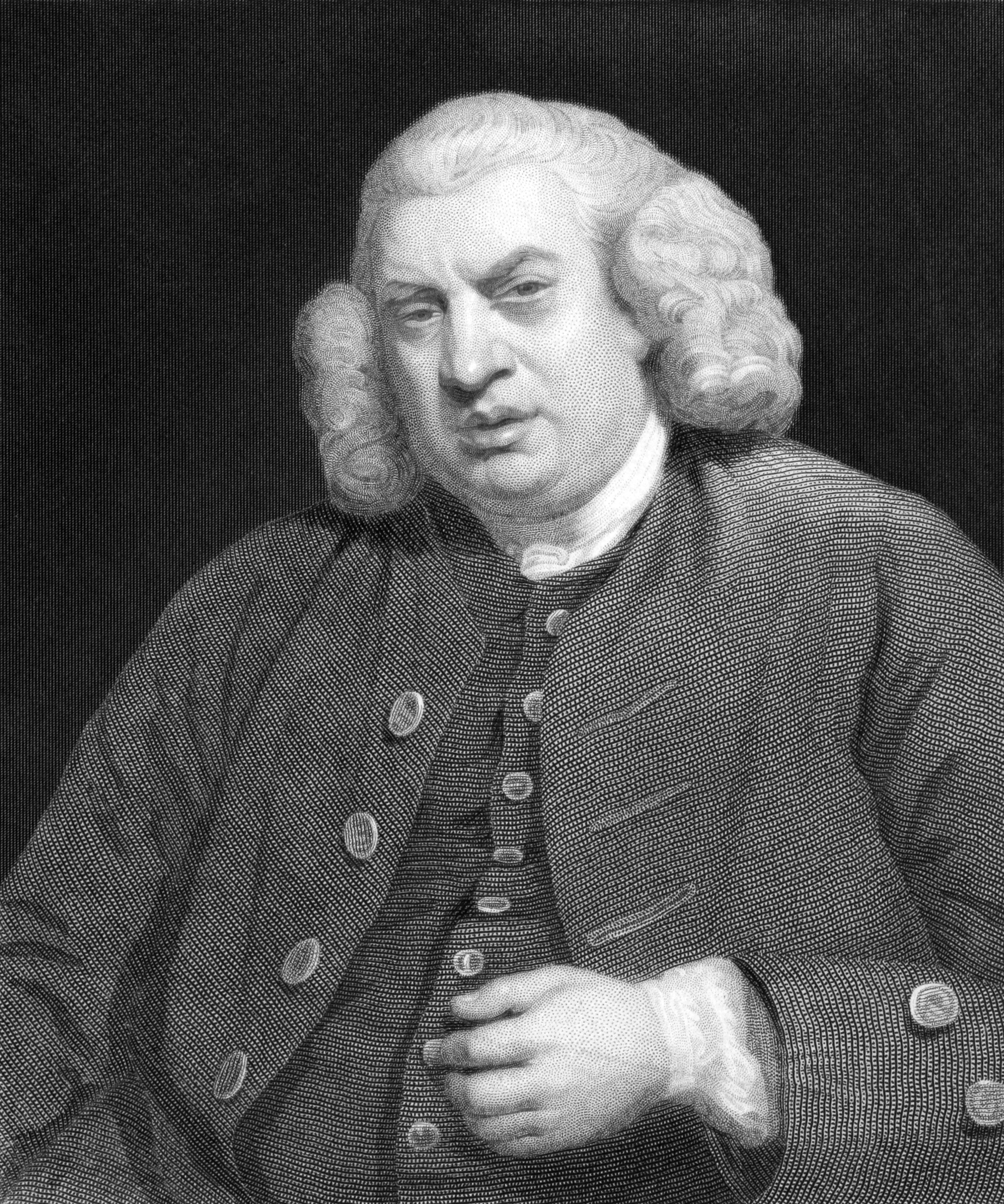
Samuel Johnson (1709–1784) circa 1772. Johnson published A Dictionary of the English Language in 1755, and was a prolific writer, poet, and critic.

Discussions with adults who have Tourette syndrome reveal that not everyone wants treatment or a "cure", especially if that means they may "lose" something else in the process. Some believe that there may even be latent advantages associated with the genetic vulnerability. Research supports some advantages associated with Tourette syndrome.

A controlled study on a small (13) group of individuals with TS found that cognitive control may be enhanced in young people with Tourette's because the need to suppress tics results in more efficient control of inhibitions. A subsequent study confirmed and extended the paradoxical result that individuals with Tourette's exhibit greater levels of cognitive control than age-matched healthy peers. There is some evidence to support the clinical lore that children with "TS-only" (Tourette syndrome in the absence of other comorbid conditions) are unusually gifted: neuropsychological studies have identified advantages in children with TS-only. A study of full-scale intelligence quotient (IQ) testing showed that children with TS-only had higher IQ scores, relative to their parents, than predicted by statistical models. Another neurological examination of motor function found that 76% of children with TS-only were faster than average on timed motor coordination, although similar results were not found among children with TS who also had ADHD. In a study of eight children, ages 8–17, those with Tourette syndrome were found to be much quicker at processing certain mental grammar skills than children without the condition. The abnormalities that lead to tics may also lead to "other rapid behaviors, including the cognitive processing of rule-governed forms in language and other types of procedural knowledge". The investigator, Michael Ullman, PhD, said, "These children were particularly fast, as well as largely accurate, in certain language tasks. This tells us that their cognitive processing may be altered in ways we have only begun to explore, and moreover in a manner that may provide them with performance that is actually enhanced compared [to] that of typically developing children".

== Notable individuals ==
There are many individuals with Tourette's, living and deceased, recognized in their fields, or for whom obsessive-compulsive tendencies associated with Tourette's may have helped fuel their success.

=== Samuel Johnson ===
An example of a person who may have used obsessive-compulsive traits to advantage is Dr. Samuel Johnson, lexicographer, who had Tourette syndrome as evidenced by the writings of James Boswell. Johnson wrote A Dictionary of the English Language in 1747, and was a prolific writer, poet, and critic. The "case of Dr Johnson accords well with current criteria for the Tourette syndrome; he also displayed many of the obsessional-compulsive traits and rituals which are associated with this syndrome".

According to Boswell,

... while talking or even musing as he sat in his chair, he commonly held his head to one side towards his right shoulder, and shook it in a tremulous manner, moving his body backwards and forwards, and rubbing his left knee in the same direction, with the palm of his hand. In the intervals of articulating he made various sounds with his mouth; sometimes giving a half whistle, sometimes making his tongue play backwards from the roof of his mouth, as if clucking like a hen, and sometimes protruding it against his upper gums in front, as if pronouncing quickly under his breath, 'Too, too, too.' All this accompanied sometimes with a thoughtful look, but more frequently with a smile. Generally when he had concluded a period, in the course of a dispute, by which time he was a good deal exhausted by violence and vociferation, he used to blow out his breath like a Whale.

There are many similar accounts; in particular, Johnson was said to act in such a manner at the thresholds of doors, and Frances Reynolds—younger sister of artist Joshua Reynolds—said that, "with poor Mrs Williams, a blind lady who lived with him, he would quit her hand, or else whirl her about on the steps as he whirled and twisted about to perform his gesticulations". When asked by English poet Christopher Smart's niece, a young child at the time, why he made such noises and acted in that way, Johnson responded: "From bad habit."

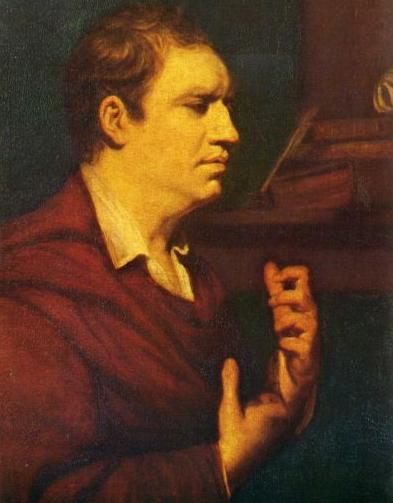
Reynold's 1769 portrait depicting Johnson's "odd gesticulations"

Johnson had a number of tics and other involuntary movements. In 1994, Pearce analysed the details provided by Boswell and others; based on the anecdotal evidence, Pearce compiled a list of movements and tics which Johnson was said to have demonstrated. From that list, he determined it was possible that Johnson had Tourette syndrome.

Pearce was not alone in diagnosing Johnson as having Tourette syndrome; in 1967 McHenry Jr was the first to diagnose Johnson with the syndrome. It was not until Arthur K. Shapiro's Gilles de la Tourette Syndrome that the diagnosis was made clear, with Shapiro declaring, "Samuel Johnson ... is the most notable example of a successful adaptation to life despite the liability of Tourette syndrome". Murray had come to the same conclusion in a 1979 British Medical Journal paper. Murray based his diagnosis on various accounts of Johnson displaying physical tics, "involuntary vocalisations" and "compulsive behaviour".

In a 2007 analysis, Kammer discussed the "documented evidence" of Johnson's tics, saying that Johnson was "known to have suffered from TS". According to neurologist Oliver Sacks, "the case for Samuel Johnson having the syndrome, though [...] circumstantial, is extremely strong and, to my mind, entirely convincing". He continues by generally describing the "enormous spontaneity, antics, and lightning quick wit" that featured prominently in Johnson's life. However, Pearce goes further into Johnson's biography and traces particular moments in Johnson's life which reinforced his diagnosis, concluding:

It is not without interest that periodic boundless mental energy, imaginative outbursts of inventiveness and creativity, are characteristic of certain Tourette patients. It may be thought that without this illness Dr Johnson's remarkable literary achievements, the great dictionary, his philosophical deliberations and his conversations may never have happened; and Boswell, the author of the greatest of biographies would have been unknown.

Other speculative posthumous diagnoses of TS, for example Mozart, are not "... as entirely convincing ... [as] the case for Samuel Johnson having TS ...".

=== Others ===
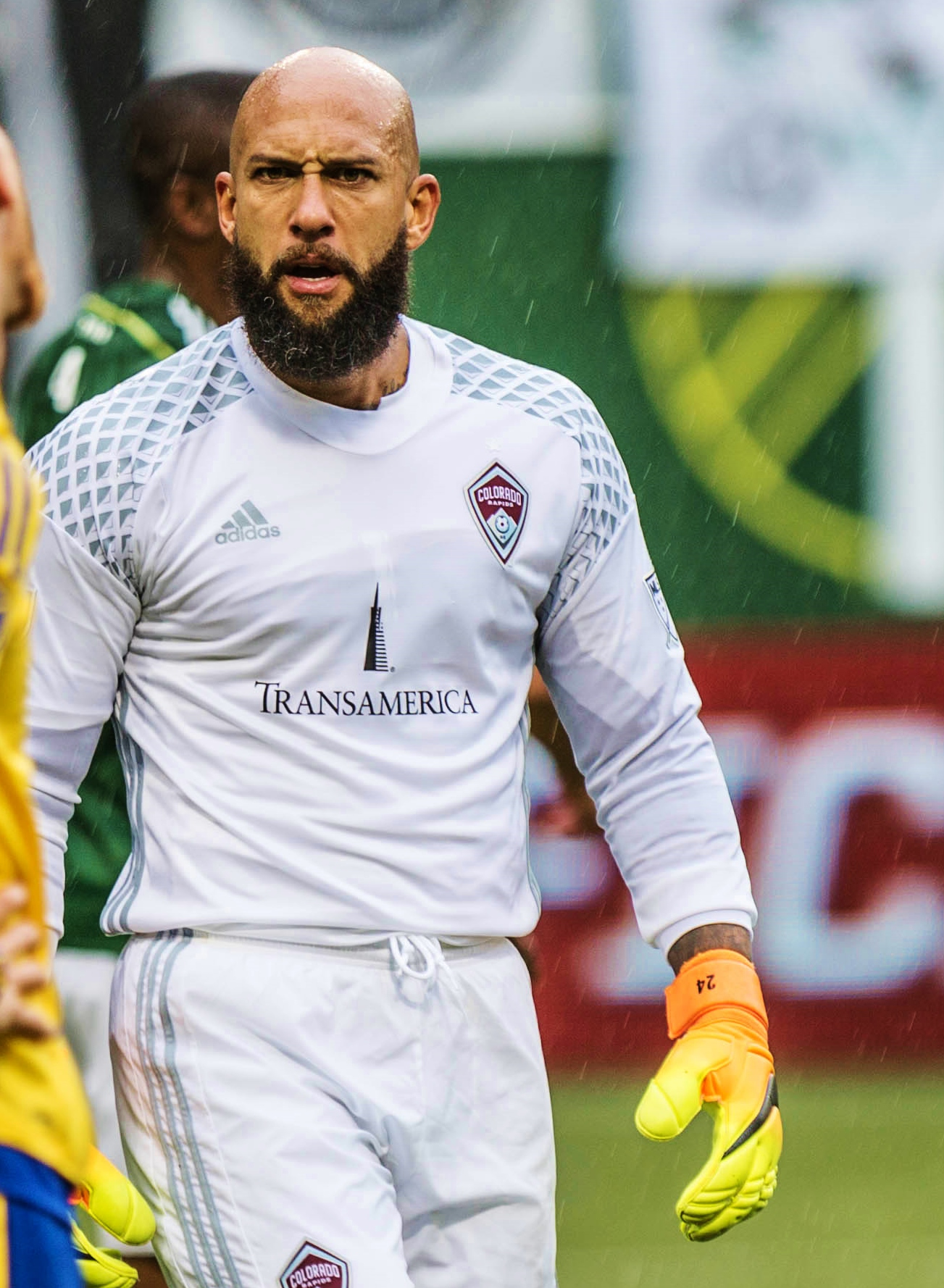
"People are said to suffer from TS and, while that is certainly true in a lot of cases, I don't feel that way. Tourette syndrome is not a problem. It is part of my life. It doesn't affect me one way or another on or off the field." – American soccer goalkeeper Tim Howard, 2003

French author, adventurer, and statesman André Malraux is thought to have had Tourette syndrome. American millionaire Howard Ahmanson, Jr also has Tourette's, as does teacher and author Brad Cohen. Catalan writer Quim Monzó has Tourette's and is the Honorary President of the Spanish Tourette Syndrome Association (APTT). Miss Iowa winner and Miss America 2013 contestant Mariah Cary (not the singer of a similar name) has Tourette's.

Recognized athletes and figures in the sports world diagnosed with Tourette syndrome include American former soccer goalkeeper Tim Howard, American former NBA player Mahmoud Abdul-Rauf, American three-time Olympic skeleton champion Eric Bernotas, American former MLB player Jim Eisenreich, American former MLB player Mike Johnston, American motocross rider Jeremy Stenberg (nicknamed "Twitch"), and American NASCAR driver Steve Wallace.

Recognized figures in the entertainment industry with Tourette syndrome include American singer-songwriter Billie Eilish, Swedish singer, music producer and DJ Basshunter, American composer Tobias Picker, English classical pianist Nick van Bloss, American jazz musician Michael Wolff, English singer-songwriter Nick Tatham, American singer James Durbin, Venezuelan internet personality Lele Pons, Scottish singer-songwriter Lewis Capaldi, American internet personality Ethan Klein, and Icelandic actor Stefán Karl Stefánsson. The Tourettes awareness project called Touretteshero was set up by Jess Thom as a place to "celebrate the humour and creativity of Tourettes".

Author and neurologist Oliver Sacks once described the case of a drummer with Tourette's who used his tics to give him a certain "flair" or "special sound" to his drumming. Sacks used the pseudonym Carl Bennett to describe real-life Canadian Mort Doran, M.D., a pilot and surgeon with severe Tourette's, whose tics remit almost completely while he is performing surgery. Australian astrophysicist Rodney Marks had Tourette syndrome.

In a radio interview with Terry Gross, comedian Dan Aykroyd once described himself as having mild Tourette's that was successfully treated with therapy when he was a preteen, as well as mild Asperger syndrome. The latter was not recognized in the 1960s when Aykroyd was a preteen, and the term was coined in 1981, later becoming a recognized diagnosis in the 1994 DSM. Tics can be caused by other disorders, including autism disorders such as Asperger's. It is unclear if Aykroyd received the diagnoses from a medical source, whether he was speaking in his role as a comic, or if the diagnoses were self-made.

=== Speculation about notable individuals ===
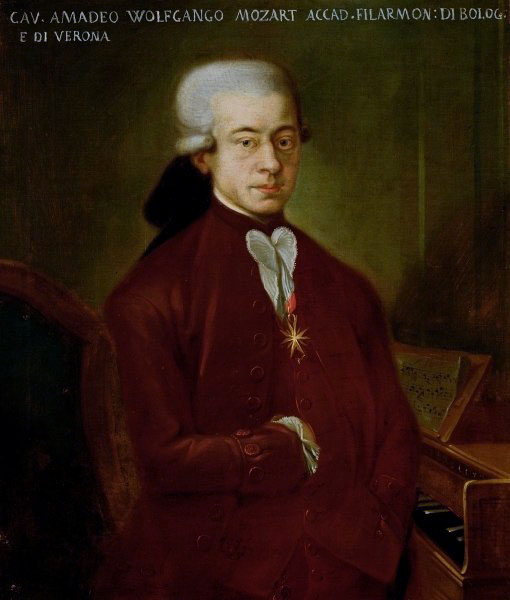
Wolfgang Amadeus Mozart in 1777, aged twenty-one. Speculation that he may have had Tourette's is not based on reliable evidence.

Although some authors have speculated that Mozart had Tourette syndrome, the evidence for this hypothesis is lacking. Benjamin Simkin, a medical doctor, argues in his book Medical and Musical Byways of Mozartiana that Mozart had Tourette syndrome. Simkin is an endocrinologist—not a psychiatrist or a neurologist, the medical fields which specialize in the neurological disorder. His claim was picked up by newspapers worldwide, causing an international sensation, and internet websites have fueled the speculation. Letters Mozart wrote to his cousin Maria Anna Thekla ("Bäsle") between 1777 and 1781 contain scatological language; he wrote canons titled Leck mich im Arsch ("Lick my arse") or variations thereof (including the pseudo-Latin Difficile lectu mihi mars). While the term "Leck mich am Arsch", when literally translated, conjures up images of sexual practices, the more accurate English meaning of this phrase is simply "Kiss my ass". The additional phrase "... recht fein schön sauber", while colorful, is still only an emphasis: that is to say, "Kiss my ass real good!". The use of this written language alone is not necessarily indicative of coprolalia, a rare symptom present in a minority of people with TS, and there are cultural explanations for Mozart's use of language. The German phrase was popularized by the Johann Wolfgang von Goethe (1749–1832) drama about the historical figure of Götz von Berlichingen. Coprolalia encompasses words and phrases that are culturally taboo or generally unsuitable for acceptable social use; it is usually expressed out of social or emotional context, and may be spoken in a louder tone or different cadence or pitch than normal conversation. The phrases uttered by a person with coprolalia do not necessarily reflect the thoughts or opinions of the person, and are embarrassing to the person uttering them.

A German psychiatrist examined the question of Mozart's diagnoses and concluded that "Tourette's syndrome is an inventive but implausible diagnosis in the medical history of Mozart". Evidence of motor tics was found lacking and the notion that involuntary vocal tics are transferred to the written form was labeled "problematic". Neurologist and author Oliver Sacks published an editorial disputing Simkin's claim, and the Tourette Syndrome Association pointed out the speculative nature of this information. No Tourette's syndrome expert or organization has voiced concurrence that there is credible evidence to conclude that Mozart had Tourette's. One TS specialist stated that, "although some web sites list Mozart as an individual who had Tourette's and/or OCD, it's not clear from the descriptions of his behavior that he actually had either."

== References in the media ==
The video media—notably the Internet, movies, and television—have been criticized for sensationalizing the symptoms of Tourette syndrome, and for creating inaccurate perceptions about people with TS in the minds of the public.

=== In film and TV ===
According to Collado-Vázquez and Carrillo (2013), film representations of tics and Tourette's, "have not been adjusted to reality, and have been used to ridicule a character, [and to] exaggerate symptoms in a comic or grotesque tone, or [display them] as a characteristic trait of a cruel and evil individual".

Television shows that are credited with helping to advance accurate information about TS include Quincy, M.E., The Practice, and 7th Heaven. A March 1981 episode of Quincy was devoted to Tourette's and orphan drugs; it "not only educated the American public about Tourette's as an organic disorder, but also helped get the then stalled 'Orphan Drug Bill' passed ... into legislation".

The entertainment industry has been accused of depicting those with TS as being social misfits whose only tic is coprolalia, which has furthered stigmatization and the general public's misunderstanding of persons with TS. The symptoms of Tourette syndrome are fodder for radio and television talk shows. Some talk shows (for example, Oprah) have focused on accurate portrayals of people with TS, while others (for example, Dr. Phil) have been accused of furthering stigmatization, focusing on rare and sensational aspects of the condition.

An incident of disinformation about coprolalia and Tourette's involved Dr. Laura Schlessinger. According to the former Tourette Syndrome Association (name changed to Tourette Association of America in 2015), she berated a caller inquiring whether a child with TS should attend a family wedding, declaring that a majority of those with the condition exhibited coprolalia and should be excluded from many social situations, provoking numerous angry calls about the misinformation. Garrison Keillor, radio show host of NPR's A Prairie Home Companion, produced a segment in 2006, titled "Broadway Tourette's", about segregating people with stereotypical TS from other passengers on a cruise ship, prompting a press release from the Tourette Syndrome Association.

Other television and film productions depicting persons with TS, or using coprolalia as a plot device, include an episode of Ally McBeal, in which Anne Heche portrays a woman with Tourette's whose leg tic causes her to run over and kill her boyfriend; "An Angel on my Tree", an episode of Touched by an Angel in which a father commits manslaughter in reaction to an event that involved his son who had Tourette's; an episode of The Simpsons, in which Bart Simpson is mentioned to claimed to have Tourette's to excuse himself from a test; and an episode of South Park, "Le Petit Tourette", in which Eric Cartman pretends to have Tourette's to get away with saying offensive things. The episode received a mixed reaction from the Tourette Syndrome Association, which commented that it provided useful information, while at the same time perpetuating outright myths about coprolalia and Tourette syndrome.

In the film Matchstick Men, the protagonist (Nicolas Cage) is a neurotic con artist with Tourette's and obsessive compulsive disorder. Other examples are The Big White, The Boondock Saints, Curb Your Enthusiasm, Deuce Bigalow: Male Gigolo, Maze, Niagara, Niagara, Not Another Teen Movie, The Predator, Phoebe in Wonderland, Son of the Sunshine, Wedding Crashers, Motherless Brooklyn,The Road Within, Vincent Wants To Sea, The Wedding Singer, The West Wing, and What About Bob?. The British comedic drama Shameless features Marty Fisher, a character with Tourette syndrome who is an arsonist.

Several documentaries have attempted to portray Tourette's syndrome accurately and to advocate for greater understanding of persons with Tourette's, while others focus on sensationalizing coprolalia. The Emmy Award-winning television documentary film I Have Tourette's but Tourette's Doesn't Have Me was produced by HBO, in conjunction with the Tourette Syndrome Association, featuring children between the ages of six and 13. It was described by the Cincinnati Enquirer as "the best simple overview yet of Tourette's". John's Not Mad (1989) and The Boy Can't Help It (2000) are documentaries about a young man from Scotland, who has severe Tourette's and coprolalia. Twitch and Shout examines a society that is quick to judge a person who strays outside the limits of conventional behavior, and was nominated for an Emmy Award. A 2007 British documentary, Tourette De France, followed a group of teenagers with Tourette's on a trip to Paris; many of the teenagers featured in the program had coprolalia. Movements and Madness: Gusti Ayu is a documentary about the struggles of a young woman with severe Tourette's in a small village in Indonesia. A 2011 BBC documentary, Tourettes: I Swear I Can Sing, followed aspiring musician Ruth Ojadi as she explains her experience of TS, and her struggle to find self-confidence in her singing. The Canadian documentary film 75 Watts (2011) profiled Matt Giordano, a drummer with Tourette syndrome who uses music to cope with the challenges of the condition.

A movie released on video, The Tic Code, stars Gregory Hines as a saxophone player with TS who befriends a 10-year-old boy with TS. It was written by Polly Draper, and produced with her husband, jazz musician Michael Wolff, who has Tourette's, and on whose life the script was loosely based. The UK movie Dirty Filthy Love tells the story of Mark Furness (Michael Sheen) with obsessive compulsive disorder (OCD) and Tourette's.

Singer Pete Bennett, the winner of the 2006 edition of British TV reality show, Big Brother 7, has Tourette syndrome. The show has been accused of exploiting Bennett's Tourette's syndrome; and the British Psychological Society (BPS) expressed concern and the possibility that BPS members involved in the series could face censure. His condition was reported to have been aggravated by drug use. Some viewers expressed concern that the show had exploited Tourette's, while others felt it was educational.

Teacher Brad Cohen wrote a book about his experiences with Tourette syndrome, which was made into a Hallmark Hall of Fame film, Front of the Class. A Bollywood remake, Hichki (meaning hiccup in Hindi), opened in 2018.

=== In social media ===
Social media campaigns supported by the Tourette Association of America have been used to encourage engagement with legislative representatives for advocacy, further tolerance and knowledge of tic disorders, and help improve self-esteem among young people with tics.

A 2012 study of YouTube videos on TS found that, while most had positive or accurate portrayals of the condition, few could be useful for education, and those with negative portrayals were more highly viewed. The negative portrayals emphasized coprolalia, and furthered stigma and stereotype for entertainment value.

Bartholomew, Wessely, and Rubin questioned in 2012 whether interaction on social media (Facebook, Twitter, YouTube, and Internet blogs) contributed to mass psychogenic illness in 2011, when adolescent girls in Le Roy, New York reported tic-like movements. (Movement disorders without an organic cause have been referred to over time using terms such as hysterical, psychogenic and psychogenic movement disorders; DSM-5 classifies them under functional neurological symptom disorder/conversion disorder and they are also referred to as functional movement disorders.) Bartholomew et al reported twitching epidemics in the US as early as 1939, and wrote that the Le Roy outbreak was the "third recorded school outbreak of conversion disorder with motor disturbances to occur in the USA since 2002", but the first in which reports of affected individuals spread via social networks.

During the COVID-19 pandemic, a dramatic increase in individuals reporting tics or tic-like movements in specialty clinics—but often assessed as functional (psychogenic) movement disorder related to YouTube and TikTok videos—was reported by researchers from Canada, Germany, the UK, and the US.

=== In music and theatre ===
The Manic Street Preachers recorded a song on the Gold Against The Soul album titled "Symphony Of Tourette". A musical about Tourette's, In My Life, opened on Broadway in October 2005, and closed quickly due to poor reviews.

In 1979, composer Robert Ashley recorded a work called "Automatic Writing", based on his involuntary speeches.

=== In books ===
Pre-dating Gilles de la Tourette's 1885 publication which defined TS, likely portrayals of TS or tic disorder in fictional literature are Mr. Pancks in Little Dorrit by Charles Dickens and Nikolai Levin in Anna Karenina by Leo Tolstoy. According to Hendrik Voss, Mr. Pancks displays vocal tics, including snorting and blowing, and obsessive behaviors. Voss says that Nikolai is portrayed as having numerous motor tics ("head, neck, and body jerks, facial wrinkling, eyebrow twitching, and grimacing"), as well as the vocal tic of shouting. The description may have been based on Tolstoy's brother, Dmitry Tolstoy, who is described as having "peculiar movements of head and neck plus inappropriate shouts".

Quit It is a 2002 novel by Marcia Byalic, targeted at teens, about a seventh-grade girl recently diagnosed with TS. A protagonist with Tourette's is presented in Jonathan Lethem's detective novel, Motherless Brooklyn. The Gwyn Hyman Rubio novel Icy Sparks was an Oprah's Book Club selection about a teenage girl who may have TS. The World's Strongest Librarian by Josh Hanagarne is an autobiographical 2014 book about a Salt Lake City, Utah librarian with TS. Michael Vey: The Prisoner of Cell 25 by Richard Paul Evans is a 2011 novel whose main character, Michael Vey, has TS. Passing for Normal: A Memoir of Compulsion (2000) is a memoir by Amy Wilensky about her experience of Tourette syndrome and obsessive–compulsive disorder.
