= Health of Samuel Johnson =

The health of Samuel Johnson has been a focus of biographical and critical analysis of his life. His medical history was well documented by Johnson and his friends, and those writings have allowed later critics and doctors to infer diagnoses of conditions that were unknown in Johnson's day.

Johnson is thought to have had scrofula, poor vision, stroke, gout, depression, Tourette syndrome, and other conditions. His health and conditions had "damaging effects on Johnson's personal and professional lives", likely causing him to lose opportunities to teach at prominent schools, while leading him "towards the invisible occupation of authorship".

== Medical history ==
=== Scrofula ===
Upon birth, Johnson did not cry and, with doubts surrounding the newborn's health, his aunt claimed "that she would not have picked such a poor creature up in the street". As it was feared that the baby might die, the vicar of St Mary's was summoned to perform a baptism. Two godfathers were chosen: Samuel Swynfen, a physician and graduate of Pembroke College, and Richard Wakefield, a lawyer, coroner, and Lichfield town clerk.

Johnson's health improved, and he was placed under the care of Joan Marklew. During this period, he contracted what is believed to have been scrofula, known at that time as "the king's evil". John Floyer, a former physician to Charles II of England, recommended that the young Johnson should receive the "royal touch", which he received from Anne, Queen of Great Britain on 30 March 1712 at St James's Palace. Johnson was given a ribbon in memory of the event, which he claimed he wore for the rest of his life. However, the ritual was ineffective, and an operation was performed that left him with permanent scarring across his face and body.

=== Eyesight problems ===
From early childhood, Johnson suffered from poor eyesight, especially in his left eye, which interfered with his education. Still, his handwriting was quite legible until the end of his life. There were somewhat contradictory reports about his eyesight from his contemporaries; he appeared to have been near-sighted. He did not use eyeglasses, which were available at that time.

His eyesight worsened with age. Boswell first met him in 1763, when Johnson was 54 years old, and noted that he had inflamed eyes. In letters written in 1773, Johnson wrote:

My fever has departed but has left me a very severe inflammation in the seeing [right] eye. . . . My eye is yet so dark that I could not read..."

=== Fear of madness ===
In 1734, Johnson feared that he was suffering from a disease that would lead to his being deemed mad. He wrote a letter in Latin to Samuel Swynfen, his godfather, about his health. Swynfen wrote back, "from the symptoms therein described, he could think nothing better of his disorder, than it had a tendency to insanity; and without great care might possibly terminate in the deprivation of his rational faculties." Swynfen's response caused Johnson to fear becoming insane even more. However, Swynfen soon afterward showed Johnson's letter to others because of its "extraordinary acuteness, research, and eloquence"—an act so upsetting to Johnson that he could never forgive Swynfen.

Boswell claimed that Johnson "felt himself overwhelmed with an horrible melancholia, with perpetual irritation, fretfulness, and impatience; and with a dejection, gloom, and despair, which made existence misery". However, Boswell blamed the common understanding of what was "sane" for Johnson's worries over being insane.

Johnson was constantly afraid of losing his sanity, but he kept that anxiety to himself throughout his life. There were, however, occasional outbursts that worried his friends. In June 1766, Johnson was on his knees before John Delap, an Anglican clergyman, "beseeching God to continue to him the use of his understanding" in a "wild" manner that provoked Johnson's friend, Henry Thrale to "involuntarily [lift] up one hand to shut his mouth". The Thrales were afraid for Johnson's mental health and took him into their home in Streatham for a few months in the hope that it might aid his recovery. Thrale's experience is similar to many other accounts; James Anderson reported Adam Smith telling him:

I have seen that creature bolt up in the midst of a mixed company; and, without any previous notice, fall upon his knees behind a chair, repeat the Lord's Prayer and then resume his seat at table. He has played this freak over and over, perhaps five or six times in the course of an evening. It is not hypocrisy, but madness.

Although this claim is similar to what the Thrales reported, Boswell wrote: "There is, I am convinced, great exaggeration in this, not probably on Smith's part, who was one of the most truthful of men, but on his reporter's."

Early on, when Johnson was unable to pay off his debts, he began to work with professional writers and identified his own situation with theirs. During this time, Johnson witnessed Christopher Smart's decline into "penury and the madhouse", and feared that he might share the same fate. In joking about Smart's madness, his writing for the Universal Visiter, and his own contributions, Johnson claimed: "for poor Smart, while he was mad, not then knowing the terms on which he was engaged to write ... I hoped his wits would return to him. Mine returned to me, and I wrote in 'the Universal Visitor' no longer". The truth was that Johnson wrote for the Universal Visiter as an "act of charity" to the ailing Smart.

Hester Thrale, in her British Synonymy Book 2, did not joke about Johnson's possible madness, and claimed, in a discussion on Smart's mental state, that Johnson was her "friend who feared an apple should intoxicate him". She made it clear whom she was referring to when she wrote in Thraliana that "I don't believe the King has ever been much worse than poor Dr Johnson was, when he fancied that eating an Apple would make him drunk." To Thrale, what separated Johnson from others who were placed in asylums for madness—like Smart—was his ability to keep his concerns and emotions to himself. However, Johnson was receiving a treatment of sorts, and it is possible that it involved a set of fetters and padlock. John Wiltshire later determined that these instruments were not symbolic, but actually used in private treatment.

=== Stroke ===
On 17 June 1783, Johnson had a stroke resulting from poor circulation, and he wrote to his neighbour, Edmund Allen, that he had lost the ability to speak. Two doctors were brought in to aid Johnson; he regained his ability to speak two days later. Johnson believed that his stroke actually helped him, as if it had some sort of cancelling effect in relation to his other health issues: "My disorders are in other respects less than usual, my disease whatever it was seems collected into this one dreadful effect. My Breath is free, the constrictions of the chest are suspended, and my nights pass without oppression".

=== Gout ===
Johnson suffered from what he and his doctors labelled as gout starting in 1775 when he was 65, and again in 1776, 1779, 1781, and 1783. He told William Boswell in 1783 that "the Gout has treated me with more severity than any former time, it however never climbed higher than my ankles." Some of Johnson's friends, and even his doctor, believed that gout would actually help him breathe. However, surgery was performed in the hope of relieving Johnson's gout. This did not cure the gout, but Johnson tried another path, which was to soak his feet in cold water; this only caused Johnson further health issues, but he claimed that it ended his gout problems.

The onset of his condition is beyond the probable onset for gout, and the way the gout was limited to Johnson's ankles, along with the confusion between arthritis and gout during Johnson's day, suggests to Pat Rogers that it was really a type of degenerative arthritis.

== Posthumous diagnosis ==
The various biographies on Johnson have provided evidence for several posthumous diagnoses of Johnson. Before the writings of Lawrence C. McHenry in 1967, many of Johnson's actions and health related aspects were characterised as part of his ongoing depression. It was not until afterwards that the depression became a secondary component of Tourette syndrome, and this diagnosis has become the dominant explanation for many of Johnson's behaviours.

=== Depression ===
There are many accounts of Johnson suffering from possible bouts of depression or what he himself thought might be "madness". As Walter Jackson Bate puts it, "one of the ironies of literary history is that its most compelling and authoritative symbol of common sense—of the strong, imaginative grasp of concrete reality—should have begun his adult life, at the age of twenty, in a state of such intense anxiety and bewildered despair that, at least from his own point of view, it seemed the onset of actual insanity". After leaving Pembroke College, Johnson began to experience "feelings of intense anxiety" along with "feelings of utter hopelessness" and lassitude.

He told John Paradise, a friend, that he "could stare at the town clock without being able to tell the hour". To overcome these feelings, Johnson tried to constantly involve himself with various activities, but this did not seem to help. Taylor, in reflecting on Johnson's states, said that Johnson "at one time strongly entertained thoughts of Suicide".

=== Tourette syndrome ===
Johnson displayed signs consistent with several diagnoses described in the Diagnostic and Statistical Manual of Mental Disorders, and it is widely accepted that Johnson had Tourette syndrome (TS), a condition unknown during Johnson's lifetime. Johnson displayed signs of TS as described by the writings of Boswell:

... while talking or even musing as he sat in his chair, he commonly held his head to one side towards his right shoulder, and shook it in a tremulous manner, moving his body backwards and forwards, and rubbing his left knee in the same direction, with the palm of his hand. In the intervals of articulating he made various sounds with his mouth; sometimes giving a half whistle, sometimes making his tongue play backwards from the roof of his mouth, as if clucking like a hen, and sometimes protruding it against his upper gums in front, as if pronouncing quickly under his breath, 'Too, too, too.' All this accompanied sometimes with a thoughtful look, but more frequently with a smile. Generally when he had concluded a period, in the course of a dispute, by which time he was a good deal exhausted by violence and vociferation, he used to blow out his breath like a whale.

There are many similar accounts; in particular, Johnson was said to act in such a manner at the thresholds of doors, and Frances Reynolds claims that, "with poor Mrs Williams, a blind lady who lived with him, he would quit her hand, or else whirl her about on the steps as he whirled and twisted about to perform his gesticulations". When asked by Christopher Smart's niece, a young child at the time, why he made such noises and acted in that way, Johnson responded: "From bad habit."

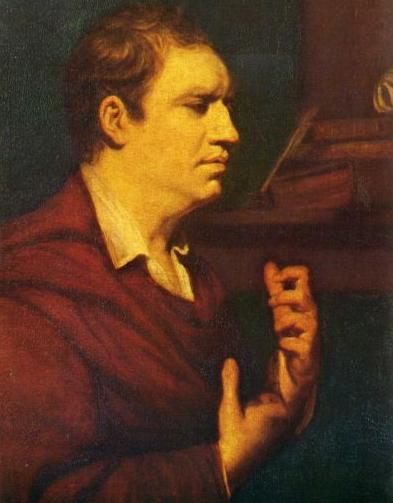
Reynolds' 1769 portrait depicting Johnson's "odd gesticulations"

He had a number of tics and other involuntary movements; the signs described by Boswell and others suggest that Johnson had Tourette syndrome (TS). In 1994, J. M. S. Pearce analysed—in a Journal of the Royal Society of Medicine report—the details provided by Boswell, Hester Thrale, and others, in an attempt to understand Johnson's physical and mental condition. Based on their anecdotal evidence, Pearce compiled a list of movements and tics which Johnson was said to have demonstrated. From that list, he determined it was possible that Johnson was affected by Tourette syndrome as described by Georges Gilles de la Tourette. Pearce concluded that the "case of Dr Johnson accords well with current criteria for the Tourette syndrome; he also displayed many of the obsessional-compulsive traits and rituals which are associated with this syndrome".

Pearce was not alone in diagnosing Johnson as having Tourette syndrome; in 1967 Lawrence C. McHenry Jr was the first to diagnose Johnson with the syndrome but in passing. It was not until Arthur K. Shapiro's Gilles de la Tourette Syndrome that the diagnosis was made clear through a comprehensive study, with Shapiro declaring, "Samuel Johnson ... is the most notable example of a successful adaptation to life despite the liability of Tourette syndrome". T. J. Murray had come to the same conclusion in a 1979 British Medical Journal paper. Murray based his diagnosis on various accounts of Johnson displaying physical tics, "involuntary vocalisations" and "compulsive behaviour".

In a 2007 analysis, Thomas Kammer discusses the "documented evidence" of Johnson's tics, saying that Johnson was "known to have suffered from TS". According to neurologist Oliver Sacks, "the case for Samuel Johnson having the syndrome, though [...] circumstantial, is extremely strong and, to my mind, entirely convincing". He continues by generally describing the "enormous spontaneity, antics, and lightning quick wit" that featured prominently in Johnson's life. However, Pearce goes further into Johnson's biography and traces particular moments in Johnson's life which reinforced his diagnosis, concluding:

It is not without interest that periodic boundless mental energy, imaginative outbursts of inventiveness and creativity, are, characteristic of certain Tourette patients. It may be thought that without this illness Dr Johnson's remarkable literary achievements, the great dictionary, his philosophical deliberations and his conversations may never have happened; and Boswell, the author of the greatest of biographies would have been unknown.

== Other ==
In 1782, Johnson was alarmed by a tumour that was diagnosed as a "sarcocele" (testicular tumour). This caused him great pain, and he underwent an apparently successful surgical operation, but the condition recurred.

Johnson stated that there had been times in his life when he drank heavily, although he mostly abstained, and that he had a problem with moderation. To hold his depression at bay, he believed in reading, exercise, diet, and moderation in alcohol use. He was guided by George Cheyne's The English Malady, a self-help guide that advocated avoidance of excess in alcohol, as well as food and sex, for alleviating mental ailments. Madden (1967) wrote that Johnson may have had a drinking problem, but that because the periods during which Johnson acknowledged drinking to excess were before the time his biographers knew him, "the full details of Johnson's pathological drinking cannot be determined".
