= History of Tourette syndrome =

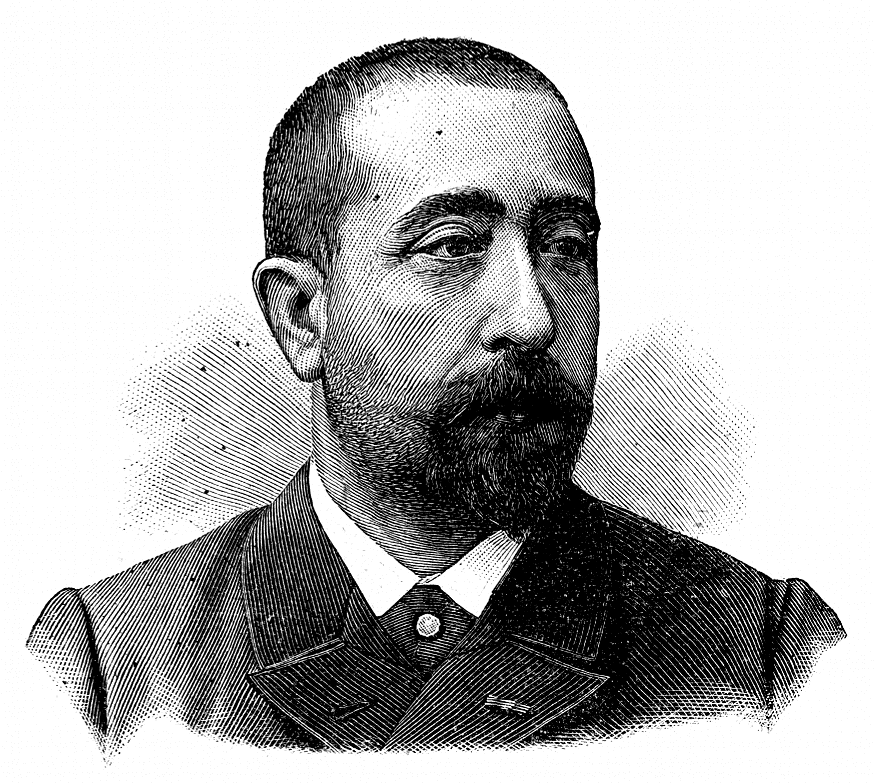
Georges Gilles de la Tourette (1857–1904), namesake of Tourette syndrome

Tourette syndrome (TS) is an inherited neurological disorder that begins in childhood or adolescence, characterized by the presence of multiple physical (motor) tics and at least one vocal (phonic) tic.

The eponym was bestowed by Jean-Martin Charcot (1825–1893) on behalf of his intern, Georges Albert Édouard Brutus Gilles de la Tourette (1859–1904), a French physician and neurologist, who published an account of nine patients with Tourette's in 1885. The possibility that movement disorders, including Tourette syndrome, might have an organic origin was raised when an encephalitis epidemic from 1918 to 1926 led to a subsequent epidemic of tic disorders. Research in 1972 advanced the argument that Tourette's is a neurological, rather than psychological, disorder; since the 1990s, a more neutral view of Tourette's has emerged, in which biological vulnerability and adverse environmental events are seen to interact.

Findings since 1999 have advanced TS science in the areas of genetics, neuroimaging, neurophysiology, and neuropathology. Questions remain regarding how best to classify Tourette syndrome, and how closely Tourette's is related to other movement disorders or psychiatric disorders. Good epidemiologic data is still lacking, and available treatments are not risk-free and not always well tolerated.

== Fifteenth century ==
The first presentation of Tourette syndrome is thought to be in the 15th-century book Malleus Maleficarum (Hammer of Witches), which describes a priest whose tics were "believed to be related to possession by the devil".

== Nineteenth century ==
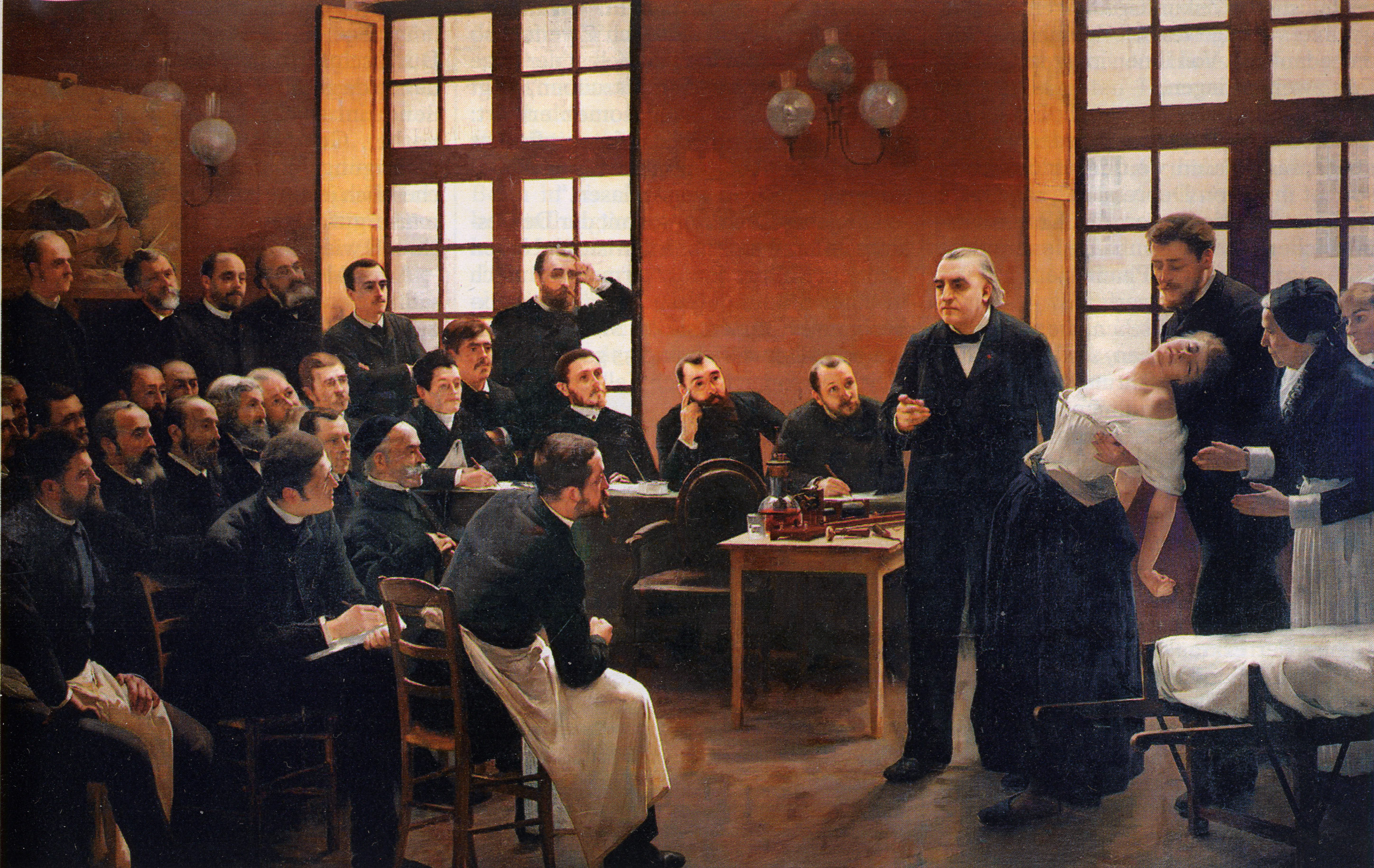
Jean-Martin Charcot (1825–1893) was a French neurologist and professor who bestowed the eponym for Tourette syndrome on behalf of his intern, Georges Albert Édouard Brutus Gilles de la Tourette. Charcot is shown here demonstrating hypnosis.

A French doctor, Jean Marc Gaspard Itard, reported the first case of Tourette syndrome in 1825, describing Mme de D (the Marquise de Dampierre) an important woman of nobility in her time, whose episodes later understood to be coprolalia "were obviously in stark contrast to the lady's background, intellect, and refined manners".

Jean-Martin Charcot, an influential French physician, assigned his student and intern Georges Gilles de la Tourette, to study patients with movement disorders at the Salpêtrière Hospital, with the goal of defining a condition distinct from hysteria and chorea. Charcot and Gilles de la Tourette believed that the "tic illness" they had observed was an untreatable, chronic, and progressive hereditary condition. History is unclear on whether Charcot had examined the Marquise de Dampierre, but his publications mention having met her socially and overhearing her most common utterances of "merde and foutu cochon (which translates literally as filthy pig but the truer colloquial meaning is 'fucking pig')".

In 1885, Gilles de la Tourette published an account of nine patients, Study of a Nervous Affliction, concluding that a new clinical category should be defined. His description included accounts of Marquise de Dampierre, previously described by Itard, as a reclusive aristocratic lady who "ticked and blasphemed" from the age of seven until her death at the age of 80 years. Gilles de la Tourette describes the common feature of involuntary movements or tics in all nine patients. The eponym was bestowed by Charcot after and on behalf of Gilles de la Tourette, who later became Charcot's senior resident.

Little progress was made over the next century in explaining or treating tics. With limited clinical experience, involving typically one or two patients, authors advanced different ideas, including brain lesions similar to those resulting from rheumatic chorea or encephalitis lethargica as a cause of tics, faulty mechanisms of normal habit formation, and treatment with Freudian psychoanalysis. The psychogenic view prevailed well into the 20th century.

== Twentieth century ==
The possibility that movement disorders, including Tourette syndrome, might have an organic origin was raised when an encephalitis epidemic from 1918 to 1926 led to a subsequent epidemic of tic disorders. The psychoanalytic theory was so dominant that it was claimed that an organic component alone would not be sufficient to produce Tourette syndrome. At the time, psychiatrists believed patients with tics must also have unresolved psychological disturbances or psychosexual conflicts, and psychiatric intervention was the preferred method of treatment. Patients and their families were told that their own psychological maladjustments were to blame for their symptoms, adding to the burden carried by the patients and their families. Until the early 1970s, psychoanalysis was the preferred intervention for Tourette syndrome.

During the 1990s, a more neutral view of Tourette's emerged, in which a genetic predisposition is seen to interact with non-genetic and environmental factors. As the beneficial effects of haloperidol (Haldol) on tics became known, the psychoanalytic approach to Tourette syndrome was questioned. The first description of haloperidol in the treatment of Tourette's was published by Seignot in 1961. The turning point came in 1965, when Arthur K. Shapiro—described as "the father of modern tic disorder research"—treated a Tourette's patient with haloperidol. Shapiro and his wife, Elaine Shapiro, reported the treatment in a 1968 article, and severely criticized the psychoanalytic approach.

The Shapiros, working with the patient families who founded in 1972 the Tourette Syndrome Association (TSA, renamed to Tourette Association of America, TAA, in 2015), advanced the argument that Tourette's is a neurological, rather than psychological, disorder, and worked to persuade the media to promote information about Tourette's. Although the original case reports of TS were by French neurologists, the "focus moved to New York in the 1970s" and "the centre for the most committed progress in TS continued to be the USA, facilitated by the success of the Tourette Syndrome Association". In 1975, The New York Times headlined an article with "Bizarre outbursts of Tourette's disease victims linked to chemical disorder in brain", and Shapiro said: "The bizarre symptoms of this illness are rivaled only by the bizarre treatments used to treat it."

The U.S. National Institutes of Health (NIH) turned down a 1972 grant proposal from the TAA (then known as the TSA) because "the reviewers believed there were probably no more than 100 cases of TS in the entire nation", and a 1973 registry reported only 485 cases worldwide. Subsequent articles on Tourette's in Good Housekeeping, The New York Times and Ann Landers produced an "enormous response, proving that there were many undiagnosed cases of TS across the United States". TS was listed as a rare disorder in the United States Orphan Drug Act of 1983, a law enacted to increase development of medications for conditions which affect small numbers of people. In 1985 pimozide was approved by the U.S. Food and Drug Administration for the treatment of the condition.

== Twenty-first century ==
Research since 1999 has advanced knowledge of Tourette's in the areas of genetics, neuroimaging, neurophysiology, and neuropathology, but questions remain about how best to classify it and how closely it is related to other movement or psychiatric disorders. Good epidemiologic data is still lacking, and available treatments are not risk-free and not always well tolerated. The TAA supports a clinical database that may help identify genes involved in Tourette syndrome, and the TSA (TAA) International Genetic Consortium has collected a database on large extended families for future studies. Novel neuroimaging studies are being employed to study tic expression and functional or cognitive deficits in TS patients. Studies of Tourette's neurophysiology and neuropathology are attempting to link deficits in Tourette's to specific brain mechanisms, and have taken advantage of a brain bank sponsored by the TAA. Clinical trials have focused on understanding tic suppression, comorbid conditions, novel treatment approaches such as botulinum toxin, and targeted behavioral therapies. Controversy remains in the areas of deep brain stimulation and PANDAS.

Multiple studies published since 2000 have consistently demonstrated that the prevalence of TS and tic disorders is much higher than previously thought. Fernandez, State and Pittenger wrote in 2018 that the rate of Tourette's in the general population is between 0.5 and 0.7%, and Robertson (2011) suggested 1%. A prevalence range of 0.1% to 1% yields an estimate of 53,000 to 530,000 school-age children with Tourette's in the United States, using 2000 census data. In the United Kingdom, a prevalence estimate of 1.0% based on the 2001 census meant that about half a million people aged five or older would have Tourette's, although symptoms in older individuals would be almost unrecognizable.

Increasing episodes of tic-like behavior affecting teenagers were reported in several countries during the COVID-19 pandemic. Researchers linked their occurrence to followers of certain TikTok or YouTube artists. (Note: Bartholomew, Wessely and Rubin questioned in 2012 whether interaction on social media (Facebook, Twitter, YouTube and Internet blogs) contributed to mass psychogenic illness in 2011 when adolescent girls in Leroy, New York reported tic-like movements. During the COVID-19 pandemic, a dramatic increase in individuals (particularly teenage girls) reporting tics or tic-like movements in specialty clinics—but often assessed as functional (psychogenic) movement disorder related to YouTube and TikTok videos—was reported by researchers from Germany, Canada, the UK, and the US.) Described in 2006 as psychogenic, abrupt-onset movements resembling tics are referred to as a functional movement disorder or functional tic-like movements. (Note: Movement disorders without an organic cause have been referred to over time using terms such as hysterical, psychogenic and psychogenic movement disorders; DSM-5 classifies them under functional neurological symptom disorder/conversion disorder.) While mass psychogenic illness is more common in developing countries, an "epidemic of leg twitching" was reported in the US as early as 1939. Psychogenic or functional tic-like movements can be difficult to distinguish from tics that have an organic (rather than psychological) cause.

== Evolution of diagnostic criteria ==
TS was first included in the third revision of the Diagnostic and Statistical Manual of Mental Disorders (DSM-III) in 1980. In 2000, the American Psychiatric Association published the DSM-IV-TR, revising the text of DSM-IV to no longer require that symptoms of tic disorders cause distress or impair functioning. The fifth revision of the DSM (DSM-5) was published in 2013: it defined tic disorders in the motor disorders chapter of the neurodevelopmental disorders, and removed the word stereotyped from the description of tics; replaced transient tic disorder with provisional tic disorder; differentiated motor and vocal chronic tic disorder; removed the use of stimulants as a cause of tics; and added two new categories of tic disorders. Few other significant changes were made.

== Organizations ==
Modeled after genetic breakthroughs seen with large-scale efforts in other neurodevelopmental disorders, three groups are collaborating in research of the genetics of Tourette's:

- The Tourette Syndrome Association International Consortium for Genetics (TSAICG)
- Tourette International Collaborative Genetics Study (TIC Genetics)
- European Multicentre Tics in Children Studies (EMTICS)

In the US, the NIH has ongoing clinical trials, and the TAA funds ongoing research through its Research Program and Research Grant Awards. Other worldwide ongoing trials can be found by contacting Tourette syndrome advocacy groups.

In Europe, the European Society for the Study of Tourette syndrome (ESSTS) published the first European clinical guidelines for Tourette syndrome and tic disorders in 2011. As of 2011, the only other guidelines in Europe were for Germany. In an editorial that accompanied the release of the guidelines, its authors said that in spite of a "high level of clinical experience, particularly in specialized centers", relative to other childhood-onset disorders, TS had been neglected in the research, possibly because TS had historically been viewed as a rare disorder, and due to the "high rate of relatively mild cases and an often favorable course with good chance of spontaneous remission". They also indicated a fragmentation in clinical approach to TS, as its core symptoms can be viewed as part of a neurology specialty (movement disorder) or child and adolescent psychiatry. They hoped the guidelines would "help clinicians to offer the best clinical service ... and inspire clinical researchers as well as politicians to no longer overlook the high burden of tic disorders".

=== Tourette Association of America ===
In 2015, the Tourette Syndrome Association changed its name to the Tourette Association of America. As of 2020, the Tourette Association of America had contacts in 50 countries. The Tourette syndrome International database Consortium (TIC) brought together data on clinical samples of patients with Tourette syndrome from twenty-two countries (Argentina, Australia, Austria, Belgium, Brazil, Canada, Denmark, Germany, Hungary, Iceland, Israel, Italy, Japan, The Netherlands, Norway, People's Republic of China, Poland, South Africa, Sweden, Turkey, the US and the UK); Tourette's has also been studied in Chile, Colombia, Costa Rica, India, Indonesia, Korea, and Spain.

=== European Society for the Study of Tourette syndrome ===
The ESSTS held its first meeting in 2000, with the goal of increasing awareness about Tourette syndrome in Europe. In 2009, working groups started to formulate the first European guidelines for TS, which were published in 2011 and updated in 2021.

== Research directions and controversies ==
Tourette's is a heterogeneous condition, with waxing and waning symptoms. The inherently changing nature of its core symptoms complicates research design, resulting in questions about medications in clinical practice. Results from case studies may not be borne out by controlled or prospective, longitudinal studies. High-profile media coverage focuses on treatments that do not have established safety or efficacy and alternative therapies involving unstudied efficacy and side effects are pursued by many parents. Compared to the progress made in gene discovery in certain neurodevelopmental or mental health disorders—autism, schizophrenia and bipolar disorder—the scale of related TS research is lagging in the United States due to funding.

The direction of current and future research in Tourette's was outlined in a 2005 journal article by the outgoing chairman of the TSA Scientific Advisory Board. Swerdlow divides the research landscape into five broad questions about Tourette's: what is it, who has it, what causes it, how it should be studied, and how it should be (medically) treated. According to Swerdlow, "the 'core' TS conundrum" is a lack of consensus about the definition of Tourette syndrome. Since vocal tics result from a "motor event (ie, a contracting diaphragm moving air through the upper airways)", TS could be defined as a disorder of motor tics, eliminating the distinction between TS and the other tic disorders. Individuals who have only tics may not be functionally impaired, raising the question of whether Tourette's as currently defined should be a DSM diagnosis. Swerdlow highlights the importance of studies in new areas such as behavioral techniques, and says that "the whole-cloth dismissal of psychologic forces in the pathobiology of TS was a strategic error". Questions remain about whether co-occurring (comorbid) conditions should be part of the core definition, and why sensory phenomena, which are a core part of Tourette's, are not part of the diagnostic criteria.

Dropping the criteria for impairment from the diagnosis resulted in higher estimates of the prevalence of TS (the question of "who has it?"). Older estimates "came from tertiary referral samples, the sickest of the sick"; greater prevalence casts the condition in an entirely new light, and calls for new biological models of the condition and new approaches to addressing a more common disorder. Discovering the causes of Tourette's may help resolve the questions of what it is and who has it. The autosomal dominant inheritance model has not been validated, and past research has been affected by the problem of referred samples, which may not reflect broader populations of persons with Tourette's. Probabilistic genetic models may yield better clues than the "one gene equals one disorder" approach. One of the most controversial presumed causes, the PANDAS hypothesis, has sparked disagreement.

Expanding criteria for the diagnosis, and increasing awareness of the impact of comorbid diagnoses, has resulted in further questions of how to study Tourette's. Tourette's patients are often recruited from sources that introduce ascertainment bias towards one 'type' of TS. Developing and applying standardized instruments, along with a greater awareness of ascertainment bias in recruitment sources, will be important in genetic studies. It is unknown if "we lose both signals and are just adding noise to the experimental outcome" when comorbid conditions, such as OCD or ADHD, are included or excluded from study samples, or samples include/exclude children or adults, or patients with severe symptoms.
