= The Drug Years =

- Genre: Documentary series
- Created by: Hart Perry, and Dana Heinz Perry
- Developed by: VH1; The Sundance Channel
- Country of origin: United States
- Original language: English
- No. of episodes: 4

Production
- Executive producers: VH1: Brad Abramson; Shelly Tatro; Michael Hirschorn; The Sundance Channel: Laura Michalchyshyn; Lynne Kirby
- Producers: Hart Perry; Dana Heinz Perry; Audrey Costadina
- Running time: ~45 minutes (commercial-free)

Original release
- Network: VH1; The Sundance Channel
- Release: 2006

The Drug Years is a 2006 television documentary series produced by the Sundance Channel and VH1 about illicit drug use in the United States in the second half of the 20th century.

It is divided into four episodes, based on chronology:

"Break On Through" (1950s–1967) This is about the sudden appearance of recreational drugs being used by beatniks and jazz musicians.
"Feed Your Head" (1967–1971) This shows the beginning and the demise of the hippie movement in America, especially in San Francisco.
"Teenage Wasteland" (1970s) This chronicles the years after the hippie movement. The explosion of cocaine and disco are explored.
"Just Say No!" (1980s–Present) This is about the crack epidemic and the war on drugs. It also shows the popularity of rehabilitation clinics in the 1980s and 1990s, as well as the prevalence of ecstasy in the rave culture.
