= Mir-24 microRNA precursor family =

Precursor microRNA family

mir-24 microRNA precursor family
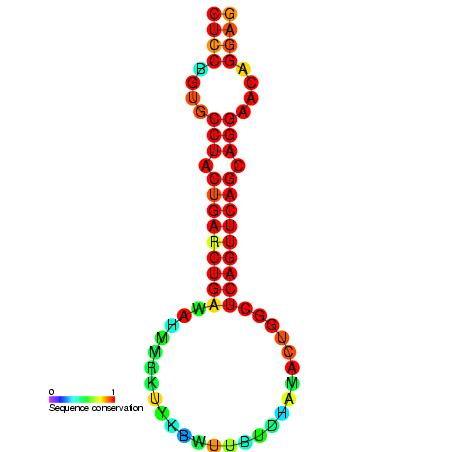
- Predicted secondary structure and sequence conservation of mir-24

Identifiers
- Symbol: mir-24
- Rfam: RF00178
- miRBase: MI0000080
- miRBase family: MIPF0000041

Other data
- RNA type: Gene; miRNA
- Domain: Eukaryota
- GO: GO:0035195 GO:0035068
- SO: SO:0001244
- PDB structures: PDBe

The miR-24 microRNA precursor is a small non-coding RNA molecule that regulates gene expression. microRNAs are transcribed as ~70 nucleotide precursors and subsequently processed by the Dicer enzyme to give a mature ~22 nucleotide product. In this case the mature sequence comes from the 3' arm of the precursor. The mature products are thought to have regulatory roles through complementarity to mRNA. miR-24 is conserved in various species, and is clustered with miR-23 and miR-27, on human chromosome 9 and 19. Recently, miR-24 has been shown to suppress expression of two crucial cell cycle control genes, E2F2 and Myc in hematopoietic differentiation and also to promote keratinocyte differentiation by repressing actin-cytoskeleton regulators PAK4, Tsk5 and ArhGAP19.

== Targets of miR-24 ==
- Lal et al. suggested that miR-24 suppresses the tumor suppressor p16(INK4a).
- Lal et al. reported that mi-24 inhibits cell proliferation by targeting E2F2, MYC via binding to "seedless" 3'UTR microRNA recognition elements.
- Amelio I. et al. suggest that miR-24 regulates keratinocyte differentiation, controlling actin-cytoskeleton dynamics via PAK4, Tsk5 and ArhGAP19 repression.
- Wang et al. have shown that miR-24 reduces the mRNA and protein levels of human ALK4 by targeting the 3'-untranslated region of mRNA.
- Mishra et al. suggest that miR-24 targets the DHFR gene.
- miR-24-1, also known as miR-189, targets SLITRK1.
