= Crisis Hotline: Veterans Press 1 =

- Film poster
- Directed by: Ellen Goosenberg Kent
- Produced by: Dana Perry
- Cinematography: Tony Hardmon
- Edited by: Geof Bartz and Gladys Mae Murphy
- Production company: HBO Documentary Films
- Distributed by: HBO
- Release date: November 11, 2013
- Running time: 40 minutes
- Country: United States
- Language: English

Crisis Hotline: Veterans Press 1 is a 2013 documentary film about the Veterans Crisis Line, directed by Ellen Goosenberg Kent and produced by Dana Perry. The film was edited by Geof Bartz, A.C.E and co-edited by Gladys Mae Murphy. The cinematography was done by Tony Hardmon. It won the Academy Award for Best Documentary (Short Subject) at the 87th Academy Awards.

== Synopsis ==
The film focuses on the employees who staff the United States Department of Veterans Affairs suicide hotline in Canandaigua, New York. The 44-minute documentary shows the emotional strain the job has on employees (many of whom are veterans, former service members, or military family members), and the deep compassion and devotion they have for veterans in a time of crisis.

== Awards and nominations ==
Awards
Award	Date of ceremony	Category	Recipients and nominees	Result
Academy Award	February 22, 2015	Best Short Subject Documentary	Ellen Goosenberg Kent and Dana Perry	Won
