= Dana Perry =

American filmmaker

Dana Perry (née Heinz) is an American filmmaker. Together with her husband Hart Perry, she operates Perry Films. She won the Academy Award for Best Documentary (Short Subject) at the 87th Academy Awards for co-producing film Crisis Hotline: Veterans Press 1 (2013); the win was shared with the film's director and co-producer Ellen Goosenberg Kent. She also directed the HBO documentary Boy Interrupted (2009), which addressed the 2005 suicide of her 15-year-old son Evan. Other documentaries include The Drug Years (2006), which won a Stony Award from High Times magazine, And You Don't Stop: 30 Years of Hip-Hop (2004) and Rhythm, Country & Blues (1994), which explores the relationship between these musical genres.
