= Retrospective diagnosis =

Practice of identifying an illness after the death of the patient

A retrospective diagnosis (also retrodiagnosis or posthumous diagnosis) is the practice of identifying an illness after the death of the patient (sometimes a historical figure) using modern knowledge, methods and disease classifications. Alternatively, it can be the more general attempt to give a modern name to an ancient and ill-defined scourge or plague.

== Historical research ==
Retrospective diagnosis is practised by medical historians, general historians and the media with varying degrees of scholarship. At its worst it may become "little more than a game, with ill-defined rules and little academic credibility". The process often requires "translating between linguistic and conceptual worlds separated by several centuries", and assumes our modern disease concepts and categories are privileged. Crude attempts at retrospective diagnosis fail to be sensitive to historical context, may treat historical and religious records as scientific evidence, or ascribe pathology to behaviours that require none. Darin Hayton, a historian of science at Haverford College, claims that retrodiagnosing famous individuals with autism in the media is pointless, as historical accounts often contain incomplete information.

The understanding of the history of illness can benefit from modern science. For example, knowledge of the insect vectors of malaria and yellow fever can be used to explain the changes in extent of those diseases caused by drainage or urbanisation in historical times.

The practice of retrospective diagnosis has been applied in parody, where characters from fiction are "diagnosed"; e.g., authors have speculated that Squirrel Nutkin may have had Tourette syndrome and that Tiny Tim could have had distal renal tubular acidosis (type I).

== Postmortem diagnosis ==
Post-mortem diagnosis is considered a research tool, and also a quality control practice and it allows to evaluate the performance of the clinical case definitions. The term retrospective diagnosis is also sometimes used by a clinical pathologist to describe a medical diagnosis in a person made some time after the original illness has resolved or after death. In such cases, analysis of a physical specimen may yield a confident medical diagnosis. The search for the origin of AIDS has involved posthumous diagnosis of AIDS in people who died decades before the disease was first identified. Another example is where analysis of preserved umbilical cord tissue enables the diagnosis of congenital cytomegalovirus infection in a patient who had later developed a central nervous system disorder.

== Examples ==
- Did Abraham, Moses, Jesus, Saint Paul or Muhammad have psychotic spectrum psychological symptoms?
- Did Tutankhamun have Klippel–Feil syndrome?
- Did Alfred the Great have Crohn's disease?
- Did botulism cause the religious visions experienced by Julian of Norwich?
- Was the English sweat caused by hantavirus?
- Was the Black Death due to bubonic plague?
- Was "the great pox" syphilis or several venereal diseases?
- Did King George III of the United Kingdom exhibit the classic symptoms of porphyria?
- Were the conditions blamed on witches at the Salem witch trials caused by ergotism?
- Did Napoleon die from stomach cancer, or was he poisoned with arsenic?
- Could Franklin D. Roosevelt's paralytic illness have been Guillain–Barré syndrome rather than poliomyelitis?
- Did Abraham Lincoln have Marfan syndrome?
- Did Karl Marx have hidradenitis suppurativa?
- Could Burke and Wills have died of thiaminase poisoning?
- Did René Descartes have Exploding head syndrome?

== Retrospective diagnoses of autism ==
There have been many published speculative retrospective diagnoses of autism of historical figures. English scientist Henry Cavendish is believed by some to have been autistic. George Wilson, a notable chemist and physician, wrote a book about Cavendish entitled The Life of the Honourable Henry Cavendish (1851), which provides a detailed description that indicates Cavendish may have exhibited many classic signs of autism. The practice of retrospectively diagnosing autism is controversial. Professor Fred Volkmar of Yale University is not convinced; he claims that "There is unfortunately a sort of cottage industry of finding that everyone has Asperger's."

== See also ==
- Charles Darwin's illness
- List of people with epilepsy (includes notes on retrospective diagnosis and misdiagnosis of historical figures)
- Mental health of Jesus
- Paleopathology
- Samuel Johnson's health
