= Brad Cohen =

American motivational speaker

- Born: December 18, 1973 (age 52); St. Louis, Missouri, U.S.
- Education: Parkway Central High School
- Occupations: Motivational speaker; teacher; school administrator; author
- Spouse: Nancy Lazarus (m. 2006)
- Children: 2

Brad Cohen (born December 18, 1973) is an American motivational speaker, teacher, school administrator, and author who has severe Tourette syndrome (TS). Cohen described his experiences growing up with the condition in his 2005 book, Front of the Class: How Tourette Syndrome Made Me the Teacher I Never Had, co-authored with Lisa Wysocky. The book has been made into a 2008 Hallmark Hall of Fame TV movie titled Front of the Class, and adapted into a hit 2018 Bollywood film Hichki.

During his childhood, Cohen was accused of being a troublemaker in school and was punished by his teachers for the tics and noises caused by TS. He decided to "become the teacher that he never had". After he graduated from college and received his teaching certificate, he was rejected by 24 elementary schools before he was hired at Mountain View Elementary School in Cobb County, Georgia. As a new teacher, he was named Georgia's First Class Teacher of the Year.

== Early life ==
Cohen was born December 18, 1973 and grew up in St. Louis, Missouri, in a Jewish family. His parents divorced during his early childhood. Cohen barked and twitched constantly during his waking hours, and would knock his knee against the inside of the car door. Someone asked his mother once if she had considered an exorcist. His mother was compassionate, but his father did not understand why his son did the things he did, often getting frustrated and punishing him for making noises or other physical tics.

Doctors initially told Cohen's mother that his tics were an emotional reaction to his parents' divorce. Teachers did not understand Cohen; they thought he was mischievous, due to the noises (tics) caused by his TS. His fifth-grade teacher forced him to walk to the front of the classroom to apologize for the noises he made and promise that he would never make them again. He felt humiliated and decided that he would become the teacher he never had, saying:

I always felt like the kid in the corner. I really needed support and acceptance from my teacher and didn't get it. From then on, I knew that I wanted to be that teacher—one who would offer support and acceptance and really be there for each kid."

When Cohen was 12 years old, his mother identified his behavior as TS from her own research. She took him to a Tourette syndrome support group meeting, where Cohen realized that other attendees "seemed resigned to a life of defeat" and was "inspired to triumph over the disorder".

In the beginning of eighth grade, after Cohen appeared on the Sally Jessy Raphaël show, his middle-school principal decided to let Cohen speak to the school about his Tourette syndrome. Cohen continued to educate people about TS, increasing his confidence and speaking skills.

Cohen graduated from Parkway Central High School in 1992, and was president of the St. Louis Council of Aleph Zadik Aleph.

== College and career ==
Cohen attended Bradley University in Peoria, Illinois, where he majored in elementary education and was a member of Alpha Epsilon Pi. During his first week at school, he was kicked out of a local fast food restaurant when an employee thought he was drunk and threatened to call the police, even as Cohen and his friends were trying to explain about his vocal tics and TS. Within hours, fellow students began to organize a boycott of the restaurant; the manager phoned Cohen and asked him to come back to the restaurant so he could apologize in person.

After graduating cum laude with many academic honors, Cohen moved to Atlanta, Georgia in the 1990s to seek employment, applying to numerous elementary schools for a teaching position. He interviewed with administrators, but his interviews were always punctuated by his tics. He was rejected 24 times before Mountain View Elementary School, in Cobb County, Georgia, hired him to teach the second and third grades.

In the classroom, Cohen, who taught about his Tourette syndrome at the beginning of each year, was popular with students; one parent requested his child be removed from his class, but asked to have the child moved back only weeks later. He was awarded the Sallie Mae First Class Teacher of the Year in 1997. Cohen later taught second grade at Tritt Elementary School in suburban Atlanta, before leaving the classroom on the path to becoming a school administrator. In the 2009-2010 school year, he was an Assistant Administrator for both Mountain View Elementary School and Chalker Elementary School. From 2010-2022, he served as Assistant Principal at Addison Elementary. Since 2022, he had been the Assistant Principal at Bells Ferry Elementary School until his retirement from Cobb County Schools at the end of the 2024-2025 school year.

== Personal life ==
Cohen was less lucky in romance, saying, "We called it second-date syndrome: I couldn't get past the first date." Cohen met Nancy Lazarus of Charleston, South Carolina, through an Internet dating service; they married in June 2006 and have two children.

== Accomplishments ==
Cohen's book, Front of the Class: How Tourette Syndrome Made Me the Teacher I Never Had, co-written with Lisa Wysocky, was published in 2005. It won the Independent Publisher Book Award for Best Education Book for that year. According to the Pittsburgh Post-Gazette, the book is "well worth reading, giv[ing] insight into what it is like to live with Tourette's—such as when Brad's noises disturbed other people at restaurants, sports bars, golf courses and movie theaters, and when Brad could get a first date with a woman but never a second".

He continued to act as a spokesman for the condition, appearing on The Oprah Winfrey Show on May 26, 2006. He has been featured in a public service announcement for the national Tourette Syndrome Association, and he serves as the vice president for the Tourette Syndrome Association of Georgia. He was a chairman of Relay for Life, a Little League coach, a Major League Baseball mascot, and has received recognition and several awards for volunteerism and community involvement.

== Hallmark Hall of Fame movie ==
The book was made into a Hallmark Hall of Fame TV movie Front of the Class; the movie aired on CBS on December 7, 2008.

Following his 2006 appearance on The Oprah Winfrey Show, in 2007 Cohen spoke at a conference after Timothy Shriver of the Special Olympics. According to Shriver, "The audience 'was laughing, then crying, then laughing, then crying, then cheering, and at the end, they gave him a huge standing ovation.'" Shriver suggested the movie to Cohen, and became the executive producer one year later. Cohen was concerned that the movie should stay truthful and avoid sensationalizing Tourette syndrome. He was pleased with the overall result, although he noted some dates in his life were sped up for effect (for example, the date of his wedding). Cohen said the portrayal of his tics is "very, very authentic".

Although tics steadily decline for most children as they pass through adolescence, Cohen still has frequent and loud vocal tics and barking. He joked: "I'm hoping I don't get kicked out of my own movie."

== Foundation ==
Cohen established the Brad Cohen Tourette Foundation, a 501(c)(3) non-profit, to provide funding for children with Tourette Syndrome to attend "camp or other social activit[ies]."

== Bibliography ==
- Cohen, Brad; Wysocky, Lisa (2008). Front of the Class: How Tourette Syndrome Made Me the Teacher I Never Had. New York: St. Martin's Griffin.ISBN 0-312-57139-9.
