= Causes and origins of Tourette syndrome =

Causes and origins of Tourette syndrome have not been fully elucidated. Tourette syndrome (abbreviated as Tourette's or TS) is an inherited neurodevelopmental disorder that begins in childhood or adolescence, characterized by the presence of multiple motor tics and at least one phonic tic, which characteristically wax and wane. Tourette's syndrome occurs along a spectrum of tic disorders, which includes transient tics and chronic tics.

The exact cause of Tourette's is unknown, but it is well established that both genetic and environmental factors are involved. Genetic techniques, including whole-exome sequencing (WES), Genome-wide Association Studies, and RNA-seq have recently identified several high-confidence risk genes and molecular pathways involved. These are largely related to neuronal migration and positioning, as well as neurotransmitter signaling and homeostasis.

Tics result from dysfunction in brain circuitry known as cortico-basal ganglia-thalamo-cortical loops, which form in the cerebral cortex (particularly the prefrontal, somatosensory, and motor cortices), thalamus, and basal ganglia. These loops are necessary for important cognitive and behavioral tasks, including action selection, attention, movement, and habit formation. The primary neurotransmitters implicated in Tourette syndrome include dopamine, serotonin, glutamate, GABA, and histamine (H3-receptor).

Non-genetic factors—while not causing Tourette's—can influence the severity of the disorder. Some forms of Tourette's may be genetically linked to obsessive-compulsive disorder (OCD), while the relationship between Tourette's and attention-deficit hyperactivity disorder (ADHD) is not yet fully understood.

== Genetic factors ==
The exact cause of Tourette's is unknown, but it is well established that both genetic and environmental factors are involved. Genetic epidemiology studies have shown that Tourette's is highly heritable, and 10 to 100 times more likely to be found among close family members than in the general population. While genome-wide association studies published in 2013 and 2015 failed to identify any specific significant genes, more recent studies have revealed multiple high-confidence risk genes. Twin studies show that 50 to 77% of identical twins share a TS diagnosis, while only 10 to 23% of fraternal twins do. But not everyone who inherits the genetic vulnerability will show symptoms. A few rare highly penetrant genetic mutations have been found that explain only a small number of cases in single families (the SLITRK1, HDC, and CNTNAP2 genes).

In some cases, tics may not be inherited; these cases are identified as "sporadic" Tourette syndrome (also known as tourettism) because a genetic link is missing.

A person with Tourette syndrome has about a 50% chance of passing the gene(s) to one of their children. Gender appears to have a role in the expression of the genetic vulnerability, with males more likely to express tics than females. Tourette syndrome is a condition of incomplete penetrance, meaning not everyone who inherits the genetic vulnerability will show symptoms. Tourette's also shows variable expression—even family members with the same genetic makeup may show different levels of symptom severity. The gene(s) may express as Tourette syndrome, as a milder tic disorder (transient or chronic tics), or as obsessive compulsive symptoms with no tics at all. Only a minority of the children who inherit the gene(s) will have symptoms severe enough to require medical attention. There is currently no way to predict the symptoms a child may display, even if the gene(s) are inherited.

Recent research suggests that a small number of Tourette syndrome cases may be caused by a defect on chromosome 13 of gene SLITRK1. Some cases of tourettism (tics due to reasons other than inherited Tourette's syndrome) can be caused by mutation. The finding of a chromosomal abnormality appears to apply to a very small minority of cases (1–2%).

== Pathophysiology ==
The basal ganglia and thalamus are implicated in Tourette syndrome.

The exact mechanism affecting the inherited vulnerability has not been established, and the precise cause of Tourette syndrome is not known. Tics are believed to result from dysfunction in the central nervous system, in the cortical and subcortical regions, the thalamus, basal ganglia, and frontal cortex of the brain. Neuroanatomic models implicate failures in circuits connecting the brain's cortex and subcortex, and imaging techniques implicate the basal ganglia and frontal cortex. Research presents considerable evidence that abnormal activity of the brain chemical, or neurotransmitter, dopamine is involved. Dopamine excess or supersensitivity of the postsynaptic dopamine receptors may be an underlying mechanism of Tourette syndrome.

Multiple neurotransmitters, like histamine (H3R), dopamine, serotonin, GABA and glutamate are involved in the etiology. After 2010, the central role of histamine (H3-receptor in the basal ganglia) came into focus in the pathophysiology of Tourette syndrome. The striatum is the main input nucleus of the basal ganglia circuit in the disorder, which is linked to the involvement of the histaminergic H3-receptor.

== Non-genetic influences ==
Psychosocial or other non-genetic factors—while not causing Tourette's—can affect the severity of TS in vulnerable individuals and influence the expression of the inherited genes. Pre-natal and peri-natal events increase the risk that a tic disorder or comorbid OCD will be expressed in those with the genetic vulnerability. These include paternal age; forceps delivery; stress or severe nausea during pregnancy; and use of tobacco, caffeine, alcohol, and cannabis during pregnancy. Babies who are born premature with low birthweight, or who have low Apgar scores, are also at increased risk; in premature twins, the lower birthweight twin is more likely to develop TS.

Autoimmune processes may affect the onset of tics or exacerbate them. Both OCD and tic disorders are hypothesized to arise in a subset of children as a result of a post-streptococcal autoimmune process. Its potential effect is described by the controversial hypothesis called PANDAS (pediatric autoimmune neuropsychiatric disorders associated with streptococcal infections), which proposes five criteria for diagnosis in children. PANDAS and the newer PANS (pediatric acute-onset neuropsychiatric syndrome) hypotheses are the focus of clinical and laboratory research, but remain unproven. There is also a broader hypothesis that links immune-system abnormalities and immune dysregulation with TS.

== Relation with OCD and ADHD ==
Some forms of OCD may be genetically linked to Tourette's, although the genetic factors in OCD with and without tics may differ. The genetic relationship of ADHD to Tourette syndrome, however, has not been fully established. A genetic link between autism and Tourette's has not been established as of 2017.
