= And You Don't Stop: 30 Years of Hip-Hop =

- Written by: Bill Adler
- Directed by: Richard Lowe; Dana Heinz Perry
- Original language: English

Production
- Producer: Audrey Costadina
- Running time: 200 minutes

Original release
- Network: VH1
- Release: October 4 – October 8, 2004

And You Don't Stop: 30 Years of Hip-Hop is a five-part documentary series directed by Richard Lowe and Dana Heinz Perry, written by Bill Adler, and released by VH1 in 2004. The series recounts the development of hip hop culture from its birth in New York City in the 1970s through its flowering into a global phenomenon in the 21st century. It was nominated for an IDA award in 2005.

== Overview ==
The series features interviews with numerous figures in the hip hop community, starting with pioneers like Afrika Bambaataa, Grandmaster Flash, Fab 5 Freddy, and Busy Bee, and moving on to Run-DMC, LL Cool J, the Beastie Boys, MC Lyte, Will Smith, Nas, Eminem, Snoop Dogg, Outkast, Dr. Dre, and Pharrell Williams among many others. Notable music business executives including Russell Simmons, Lyor Cohen, and Jimmy Iovine are also interviewed, as are the writers Danyel Smith, Cheo Coker, Nelson George, and Kelefa Sanneh.

== Reception ==
In a review for The New York Times, television critic Virginia Heffernan wrote: "And You Don't Stop stands out among the crisp, heavily graphic offerings usually on MTV and VH1, and it does a more thorough job than any film of collating 30 years of history given by hip-hop's DJ's, MC's, rappers, critics and fans". Phil Gallo of Variety described the series as "“a rather remarkable overview, free of narration and ivory tower posturing...that is weighted carefully and accurately, full of fabulous grainy footage of the music’s early days." Don Kaplan of the New York Post asserted that, with And You Don't Stop, "VH1 does for rap what PBS did for the Civil War." In 2012, Complex.com's Shanté Cosme counted it among "The 25 Best Hip-Hop Documentaries."
