= SLITRK1 =

Protein-coding gene in the species Homo sapiens

Identifiers
- Aliases: SLITRK1, LRRC12, TTM, SLIT and NTRK like family member 1, slitrk1
- External IDs: OMIM: 609678; MGI: 2679446; GeneCards: SLITRK1
Available structures
| PDB | Ortholog search: PDBe RCSB |
| PDB | List of PDB id codes 4RCA, 4RCW |

Gene location (Human)
| Chr. | Chromosome 13 (human) |
| Band | 13q31.1 | Start | 83,877,205 bp |
| Band | 13q31.1 | End | 83,882,474 bp |

Gene location (Mouse)
| Chr. | Chromosome 14 (mouse) |
| Band | 14|14 E3 | Start | 109,146,232 bp |
| Band | 14|14 E3 | End | 109,151,590 bp |
RNA expression pattern
| Bgee | Human / Mouse (ortholog); Top expressed in: Brodmann area 46; prefrontal cortex; Brodmann area 23; endothelial cell; superior frontal gyrus; entorhinal cortex; postcentral gyrus; middle temporal gyrus; primary visual cortex; Brodmann area 9 / Top expressed in: lateral septal nucleus; primary motor cortex; piriform cortex; cingulate gyrus; ventromedial nucleus; subiculum; superior colliculus; lateral hypothalamus; paraventricular nucleus of hypothalamus; anterior amygdaloid area; More reference expression data |
| BioGPS | n/a |
Gene ontology
| Molecular function | protein binding |
| Cellular component | integral component of membrane; membrane; synapse; extracellular region; cell junction; plasma membrane; glutamatergic synapse; GABA-ergic synapse; integral component of postsynaptic density membrane |
| Biological process | adult behavior; nervous system development; multicellular organism growth; homeostatic process; positive regulation of synapse assembly; synapse assembly; positive regulation of axonogenesis; axonogenesis; regulation of synapse organization; synaptic membrane adhesion; regulation of presynapse assembly |
Sources:Amigo / QuickGO
Orthologs
| Databases | NCBI: entry; OMA: entry |
| Species | Human | Mouse |
| Entrez | 114798 | 76965 |
| Ensembl | ENSG00000178235 | ENSMUSG00000075478 |
| UniProt | Q96PX8 | Q810C1 |
| RefSeq (mRNA) | NM_052910; NM_001281503 | NM_199065 |
| RefSeq (protein) | NP_001268432; NP_443142 | NP_951020 |
| Location (UCSC) | Chr 13: 83.88 – 83.88 Mb | Chr 14: 109.15 – 109.15 Mb |
| PubMed search |
- Wikidata
| View/Edit Human | View/Edit Mouse |

SLITRK1 ("SLIT and NTRK-like family, member 1") is a human gene that codes for a transmembrane signalling protein that is part of the SLITRK gene family, which is responsible for synapse regulation and presynaptic differentiation in the brain. Expression of the gene has been linked to early formation of excitatory synapses through binding with receptor tyrosine phosphatase PTP (LAR-RPTP). Various studies over the years have linked mutations in the gene to conditions on the OCD spectrum, Tourette syndrome and trichotillomania, however the mutations in the genome itself vary greatly between individuals, with most mutations observed being hard to find in repeat studies.

Members of the SLITRK family, such as SLITRK1, are integral membrane proteins with 2 N-terminal leucine-rich repeat (LRR) domains similar to those of SLIT proteins (see SLIT1; MIM 603742). Most SLITRKs, but not SLITRK1, also have C-terminal regions that share homology with neurotrophin receptors (see NTRK1; MIM 191315). SLITRKs are expressed predominantly in neural tissues and have neurite-modulating activity (Aruga et al., 2003).

== Gene ==
The gene for SLITRK1 is located on chromosome 13q31.1. The gene is expressed only in the brain of humans. The mRNA can differ due to alternative splicing, and contains domains for the extracellular matrix as well as for the LRRs. Mice contain an ortholog of the gene called Slitrk1.

== Protein structure ==
SLITRK1 contains 2 horseshoe shaped leucine rich repeat domains (LRRs) in its extracellular domain which are vital to its function. The LRRs have 6 modules each and are connected by a 70-90 amino acid loops. LRR1 is a more conserved sequence and is present as a dimer while LRR2 is a monomer and has a more variable sequence. The conserved sequence of LRR1 contains critical binding pockets and specific charged residues that are important for it to carry out its function of binding to LAR-RPTPs on the N-terminus. Both LRR sequences are randomly positioned on the protein and contain variable linker regions. The protein also contains a short intracellular domain, but lacks a tyrosine phosphorylation motif which is present in other SLITRK genes.

== Function ==
SLITRK1 is highly expressed in the central nervous system. It plays a critical part in regulating synapse formation between hippocampal neurons and in differentiation of synapses, helping in neuronal outgrowth. It is expressed during embryonic stages and postnatally but expression decreases over time and is localized to the postsynaptic membrane.

Overexpression of SLITKR1 promotes postsynaptic differentiation for excitatory and inhibitory synapses, but because of the localization only excitatory synapses are affected. Inhibition of SLITKR1 only reduces differentiation of excitatory synapses because of this.

=== Interaction with LAR-RPTP ===
Since they lack tyrosine phosphorylation motifs, SLITKR1 binds to LAR-RPTP through its LRR1 region in order to differentiate synapses. The LRR2 domain's function is not clearly understood yet but it is hypothesised that it is for dimerization to the cell surface.

LAR-RPTP binds to the LRR1 region through its PTPδ Ig region, with 3 separate binding sites in a 1:1 binding ratio. Ig1 binds through electrostatic and hydrophobic interactions, Ig2 binds through ionic and hydrogen bonds, and Ig2 binds through hydrogen bonding. The unique properties on the concave surface are what determine which LAR-RPTP binds to it. If the proper LAR-RPTP is not bound to the LRR1 then synapse formation cannot occur, but bonding can still occur. Once they are bound properly, the complex is sufficient for synapse differentiation. Point mutations in the LRR1 region impaired differentiation as well but not binding.

== Clinical significance ==
=== Tourette syndrome ===
The SLITRK1 gene "is not a major risk gene for the majority of individuals" with Tourette syndrome (TS), according to a 2009 review, although its study can help contribute to our understanding of TS. Rare variants in SLITRK1 may lead to TS, and mutations in non-coding regions of SLITRK1 may also play a part, but further research needs to be done before any conclusions can be drawn.

In 2005, medical researchers observed a de novo translocation on 13q in a patient with TS which broke the patient's chromosome near the SLITRK1 genome. In screening of additional patients, the authors observed a frameshift mutation in SLITRK1 in a patient with TS and the same rare ncRNA target variant (called var321 and varCDfs; target of miR-24-1) in two patients with TS. These variants were not found in several thousand controls supporting an association of the variants with TS.

A subsequent examination of the region of the SLITRK1 gene found the mutation in none of 82 patients with Tourette syndrome. The authors concluded that tests to detect variant(s) in the gene probably would have little diagnostic utility. An experiment in the effects of a microdeletion in chromosome 13q31.1 was done in a fetus, the mother had passed the microdeletion to the child and both did not have tourettes or any other OCD symptoms, showing that it may not be a direct cause of tourettes. Further attempts to replicate the study were done in multiple studies. In a Japanese study, next-gen sequencing was used to screen 92 TS patients and 361 healthy controls, none of TS patients were found to have mutations at either variant or any new mutations in the gene. In a European study it was found that the 2 original variations were not found in any of the 222 trios that were studied. However, tests were also done on SNPs in the groups and 3 were found to have variations. Two of the three variations were found to be associated with the formation of Tourette syndrome. In a different study of 381 Caucasians with some form of OCD with 356 non-OCD control patients, 3 genetic changes were found after genetic screening. Of the 3, 2 were identified only once each and the third was found in 4 OCD patients but also in a non-OCD patient. The non-OCD patient did have compulsive nail biting, but these studies show that a genetic link between SLITRK1 and patients with TS may exist they are more complex in nature than previously understood.

=== Trichotillomania ===
The SLITRK1 gene has also been implicated in a small percentage of cases of trichotillomania, an impulse disorder in which individuals compulsively pull their own hair. In one of the previously mentioned studies the mother of the child who had a de novo translocation on 13q had trichotillomania; this would suggest that there could be a genetic link between SLITRK1 and trichotillomania as well.

A study was done in which 44 families with individuals who had trichotillomania had their SLITRK1 gene sequenced. Two new non-synonymous mutations were discovered about 9 base pairs apart from each other, in an area separate from the one where the Tourette mutations were found. These results were compared to a control and none had the mutation, suggesting that these mutations, while rare, were associated with trichotillomania.

== See also ==
- SLITRK2
- Protein tyrosine phosphatase
