= Beth Aala =

American filmmaker

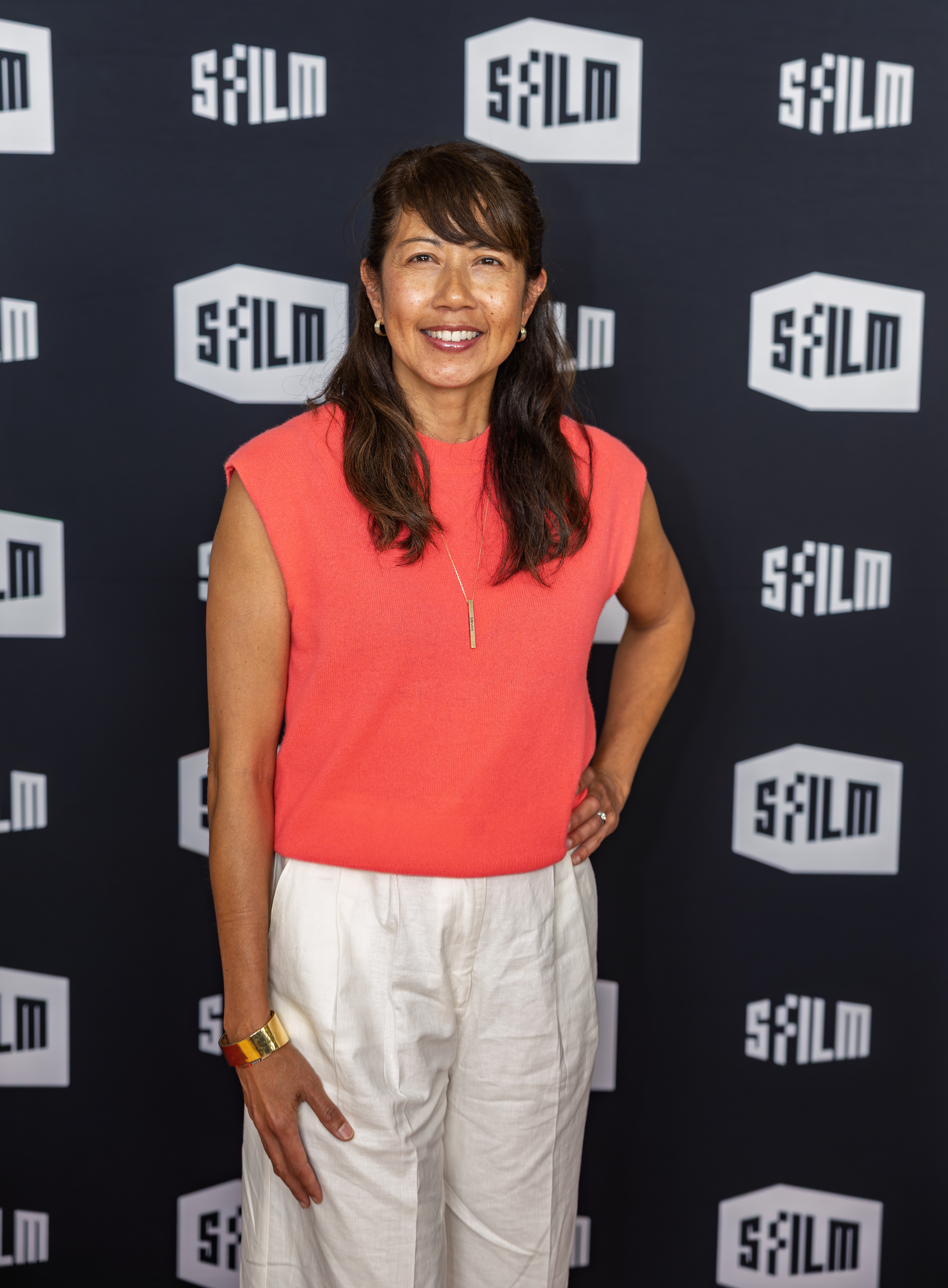
- Aala at SFFILM in 2026
- Born: United States
- Citizenship: American
- Occupations: Documentary filmmaker film producer
- Notable work: Supermensch: The Legend of Shep Gordon, Rancher, Farmer, Fisherman, Made in Boise
- Awards: Emmy Award, Peabody Award

Beth Aala is an American documentary filmmaker and film producer.

== Life ==
Aala's parents emigrated from the Philippines to the United States, where she was born. She attended Elk Grove High School in Sacramento. Aala received a bachelor's degree from UC San Diego in both Visual Arts and Communication.

== Film career ==
Aala is best known for her 2013 film, Supermensch: The Legend of Shep Gordon, which she co-directed and produced with comedian Mike Myers.

She was the co-director, with Susan Froemke and John Hoffman, of the film Rancher, Farmer, Fisherman, which premiered at the Sundance film festival in 2017.

Aala directed Made in Boise, which premiered in June 2019 at the AFI DOCS film festival. The film is a documentary on commercial surrogacy and follows four surrogates. The film would get a wider release as part of PBS documentary series Independent Lens on October 16, 2019.

In 2023 Aala directed Uncharted, a film that shows the behind the scenes of Alicia Keys' songwriting camp, "She is the Music". The film premiered at the 2023 Tribeca Festival.

== Awards ==
In 2005, Aala won an Emmy Award for co-producing I Have Tourette's but Tourette's Doesn't Have Me. She also received Emmys for producing in the "Outstanding Children's Program" category in 2008 and 2011.

In 2006, she won a Peabody Award for co-producing the film The Music in Me.

In 2020, Made in Boise would be nominated for Outstanding Business and Economic Documentary at the 41st News and Documentary Emmy Awards.
