= Ellen Goosenberg Kent =

American film producer and director

- Occupations: Film producer and director
- Years active: 1992–present

Ellen Goosenberg Kent is an American film producer and director. She is best known for directing and co-producing documentary film Crisis Hotline: Veterans Press 1 (2013), which won the Academy Award for Best Documentary (Short Subject) at the 87th Academy Awards; the win was shared with producer Dana Perry. Throughout her career, she has worked on numerous films, mostly on television documentaries, including I Have Tourette's but Tourette's Doesn't Have Me (2005) and Alive Day Memories: Home from Iraq (2007). She has won four Emmy awards out of six nominations for her work on HBO.
