= Boy Interrupted =

- Promotional poster
- Directed by: Dana Perry
- Produced by: Dana Perry
- Cinematography: Hart Perry
- Production company: Perry Films
- Distributed by: HBO Films
- Release date: 2009
- Running time: 92 minutes
- Country: United States
- Language: English

Boy Interrupted is a 2009 documentary film on the life and death of Evan Perry, who experienced bipolar depression from a young age. When his parents, Dana and Hart Perry, consulted psychiatrists about Evan's suicidal comments or other signs of depression, medical professionals did not believe that he was mentally ill, and the footage was originally intended to show his symptoms and help access to the treatment he needed. The film's title is based on the 1999 film Girl, Interrupted.

Evan was diagnosed with depression at age 5, and was later diagnosed with bipolar depression. Despite the treatment and medication received, he died by suicide in 2005 at age 15. Evan Perry had a family medical history involving serious mental illnesses. The documentary focuses on how his bipolar depression affected him and those close to him.

About four years after Evan's death, the documentary was shown at the Sundance Film Festival and released on television and DVD.

== Story ==
=== Early childhood ===
In his early childhood, Evan was very loving towards his family and other people. At school, he was always the model student, behaving very well and being helpful. When he was four years old, he started telling his mom that he wanted to kill himself. It shocked her because she thought kids would not know what death is at that age, and he did not seem sad when he was talking about dying. In kindergarten, Evan said he wanted to kill himself in front of the whole class. The teacher told his parents, and Hart and Dana Perry took him to see a therapist.

In 1995, mental health professionals were uncertain whether young children could be depressed. Dana Perry, a professional filmmaker, knew that psychiatrists would not believe anything she told them about her son. At that point, she decided to film as much as she could from Evan's life, especially when he talked about suicide.

At age 5, Evan Perry was diagnosed with depression, and he was prescribed Prozac. The medication did not seem to work, but it was their only choice, so they decided to give it time. Evan was interested in film, just like his parents. At home, he would make skits with his brothers and film vacations, and at school, he would make plays. Most of his plays were about death.

By the time Evan was 7 years old, his responses towards his family were short. He was listening to Nirvana, writing songs about suicide, demons, and pain, and he would lock himself in his room. His parents knew this behavior wasn't normal at this age, and they were concerned, but there wasn't much they could do.

=== Middle childhood ===
At age 10, Evan started attending Pk Yonge School. He attempted suicide for the first time by sneaking onto the school roof. One of his teachers intervened, and he was sent to the Four Winds mental institution by his parents. Following his diagnosis with Bipolar depression at the Four Winds mental institution, Evan was prescribed lithium. After becoming stable enough to leave, he attended Wellspring, a home for troubled kids. He ran away on his first night but eventually gave in and received treatment. Family therapy at Wellspring improved the family's communication and understanding for Evan. After showing progress at Wellspring, Evan was sent to York Prep School, displaying healthier behavior and engaging in typical activities.

=== Adolescence ===
Evan showed progress socially at school, engaging in filmmaking with his friends. Despite being close to his family and friends, his bipolar depression remained unnoticed until shortly before his suicide. At 15, Evan requested to stop taking lithium, gradually reducing his dosage with therapist approval. However, his symptoms quickly worsened after stopping it, resulting in a decision to return to full dosage. Three days before his appointment, after an argument with his mother about doing his homework, Evan locked himself in his room. He left behind a list of reasons to live and die before committing suicide through jumping from his window.

== Family ==
=== Hart Perry (father) ===
Evan's father had a brother who was diagnosed with bipolar depression and committed suicide at the age of 21. Because of this, he did everything he could to prevent the same outcome for his son, Evan Perry. Hart did everything he could to make Evan happy and was very supportive; he would film and go to therapy with him. On the day of Evan's suicide, Hart found him after he had jumped from the window. Despite checking in on Evan 5 minutes earlier, he couldn't change the outcome.

=== Dana Perry (mother) ===
Evan's mother was equally supportive of Evan. It was her idea to film Evan's life so that therapists would believe her and have a better idea of what was going on. When Evan was 5 years old, he explained his detailed suicide plan to her. She recorded it and put it in the documentary. It revealed Evan climbing onto his bed and showing his mom how he was going to hang himself from the roof of his room. Dana Perry was very caring towards her son, trying everything she could to stop his story from ending so soon.

=== Nick Perry (brother) ===
Nick Perry was Evan's half brother from his father's side of the family. Throughout the documentary, Nick explained how most of the songs Evan wrote were relatable for someone Nick's age in high school. When Evan committed suicide, Nick rushed over to the Perry's house. When he discovered the suicide note, he realized that everything Evan wrote was a common experience. Evan was scared of failing, wanted to fit in, and was insecure. Nick felt like this at one point or another, and Evan had only felt it in a different intensity. Because of this, Nick felt responsible for Evan's suicide; he believed that if he had talked to him, Evan would have still been alive.

== Production ==
The film was made by the boy's parents, director Dana Perry and cinematographer Hart Perry. It was made for HBO Documentary Films, being shown on TV and released on DVD. It was also shown at Sundance in January 2009.

== Critical response ==
Variety noted that because of his parents' occupations, they did a good job in recording his life, and produced an "elegiac little gem". The Philadelphia Inquirer called it a "remarkable, deeply unsettling documentary", scoring it 3/4 stars. The Movie Blog criticised the production quality, but found that the film still "communicated effectively and with a lot of emotion". SI Live suggested that the boy's story perhaps did not merit a documentary, but it was "valuable viewing" in that it would educate people a little about mental illness.

Rotten Tomatoes records three positive reviews and no negative.
