= Supermensch: The Legend of Shep Gordon =

2013 film

- Theatrical release poster
- Directed by: Mike Myers
- Produced by: Beth Aala
- Starring: Shep Gordon
- Cinematography: Michael Pruitt-Bruun
- Edited by: Joseph Krings
- Production companies: A&E IndieFilms; Nomoneyfun Films
- Distributed by: RADiUS-TWC
- Release dates: September 7, 2013 (TIFF); June 6, 2014 (United States)
- Running time: 84 minutes
- Country: United States
- Language: English
- Box office: $220,065

Supermensch: The Legend of Shep Gordon is a 2013 American documentary film about talent manager Shep Gordon, produced and directed by Mike Myers in his directorial debut. The film is the account of Gordon's career and his clients such as Alice Cooper, Blondie, Teddy Pendergrass, and Pink Floyd. The film also addresses Gordon's personal life and his interest in cooking, producing films, and his Buddhist beliefs.

The film was screened in the Gala Presentation section at the 2013 Toronto International Film Festival. It won the audience award for best documentary at the 2014 Sarasota Film Festival, and also screened at the 2014 Tribeca Film Festival. It was released theatrically on June 6, 2014.

== Cast ==
The film's narrative is driven primarily by Shep Gordon as he recounts the story of his career. Supporting interviews feature some of the many friends and associates in his life, including actors Michael Douglas, Sylvester Stallone, Tom Arnold and Mike Myers, musicians Alice Cooper, Willie Nelson, Mick Fleetwood, Steven Tyler, Sammy Hagar and Anne Murray, film producer Carolyn Pfeiffer, record producer Bob Ezrin, NBA coach Don Nelson, and celebrity chef Emeril Lagasse.

== Reception ==
Supermensch: The Legend of Shep Gordon received generally positive reviews. Review aggregator Rotten Tomatoes gave the film an approval rating of 78% based on reviews from 79 critics. The site's critical consensus reads: "Its unabashedly positive tone may strike some viewers as disingenuous, but even if Supermensch doesn't tell the whole story, it's an undeniably entertaining one." Metacritic gives the film a score of 64/100 based on reviews from 26 critics.

David Rooney of The Hollywood Reporter described Myers's film as a "sloppy kiss on an entertainment industry maverick" and called it "brisk", "entertaining", and "somewhat scattered". Justin Chang of Variety wrote: "It’s an affectionate, sometimes downright slobbery career salute with a soft, unexamined center — a moving experience for all involved, no doubt, but one of limited interest outside the celebrity bubble it depicts." Mark Adams of Screen Daily described the work as "warm-hearted", "enjoyably fluffy", and "a genially non-critical film that leaves audiences with a smile".
