= Front of the Class =

2008 American television film

- Promotional image
- Genre: Biographical drama
- Based on: Front of the Class by: Brad Cohen; Lisa Wysocky
- Written by: Tom Rickman
- Directed by: Peter Werner
- Starring: Jimmy Wolk; Treat Williams; Patricia Heaton; Dominic Scott Kay; Johnny Pacar
- Music by: Ernest Troost
- Country of origin: United States
- Original language: English

Production
- Executive producers: Tim Shriver; Brent Shields
- Producer: Andrew Gottlieb
- Cinematography: Paul Elliott
- Editor: David Beatty
- Running time: 95 minutes
- Production companies: Hallmark Hall of Fame Productions; McGee Street Productions

Original release
- Network: CBS
- Release: December 7, 2008

Front of the Class is a 2008 American biographical drama television film directed by Peter Werner and written by Tom Rickman, based on the 2005 memoir Front of the Class: How Tourette Syndrome Made Me the Teacher I Never Had by Brad Cohen and co-authored by Lisa Wysocky, which tells of Cohen's life with Tourette syndrome and how it inspired him to teach other students.

Front of the Class stars newcomer James Wolk as Cohen, and Treat Williams and Patricia Heaton as his parents. It aired on CBS on December 7, 2008, as an episode of Hallmark Hall of Fame.

== Plot ==
Twelve-year-old Brad Cohen lives in Missouri with his divorcée mother, Ellen, and younger brother, Jeff. He constantly gets into trouble with his father Norman and his teachers at school due to his tics. In one class, his teacher calls him to the front to make him apologize to his class for disrupting the class and promise he won't do it again. Determined to find out what is wrong with her son, Ellen seeks medical help. A psychiatrist believes that Brad's tics are the result of his parents' divorce. Ellen takes her search to the library and comes across Tourette syndrome in a medical book. She shows this to the psychiatrist, who agrees with the diagnosis, and says that there is no cure. Brad and his mother soon attended a support group. From then on, Brad aspires to never be like the other members of the support group and to become successful.

At the beginning of middle school, Brad is sent to the principal's office for being disruptive. The principal invites him to the school concert later in the afternoon. At the end of the concert, which Brad's Tourette's tics had disturbed, he calls Brad up to the stage and asks Brad to talk about his condition. As Brad makes his way back to his seat, the school applauds him. From that moment on, Brad aspires to become a teacher, just like the principal.

As an adult, Brad lives with his roommate Ron in Georgia and his rabbit named "Waffle" and is looking for work as an elementary school teacher. He is turned down after 24 interviews because of his Tourette syndrome and finally gets an interview where the staff is accepting and they give him the job.

On his first day, Brad explains the syndrome to his students. He helps a boy with ADHD and OCD, Thomas, with reading and makes an impression on Heather, a girl with terminal cancer. Another student's father pulls her out of Brad's class as he fears Brad will distract her. When the little girl tries to sneak into Brad's class again, he expresses his gratefulness but doesn't oppose the girl's father's wishes and reminds her that her father is doing what he thinks is best for her.

Brad meets a woman named Nancy Keene on an online dating site. After dating her for some time, he invites her over for Thanksgiving back at Ellen's house, where he tells Nancy he loves her, and the feeling is reciprocated. He confides in Ellen his concern that Nancy will get fed up with his tics, but she reassures him that he must not let his condition get in the way.

An observer at the school assesses Brad's teaching, and the head teacher announces that Brad has been chosen to receive the Teacher of the Year award, which he accepts in front of his family, friends, and students.

A textual epilogue reveals that Brad got his master's degree, dressed up as the Atlanta Braves' mascot, and married Nancy in 2006.

== Cast ==
- James Wolk as Brad Cohen
  - Dominic Scott Kay as young Brad Cohen
- Treat Williams as Norman Cohen; Brad's father
- Patricia Heaton as Ellen Cohen; Brad's mother
- Johnny Pacar as Jeff Cohen; Brad's younger brother
  - Charles Henry Wyson as young Jeff Cohen
- Sarah Drew as Nancy Keene; Brad's girlfriend. Based on Cohen's real-life wife Nancy Lazarus
- Charlie Finn as Ron; Brad's roommate
- Kathleen York as Diane Cohen; Brad's stepmother and Norman's second wife
- Joe Chrest as Jim Ovbey
- Mike Pniewski as Principal Myer
- Katherine Shepler as Heather; one of Brad's students who dies of cancer
- Zack Miller as Thomas; a troubled student in Brad's class
- Anna Rappaport as Amanda; a former student of Brad's whose father takes her out of his class because of his Tourette's
- Ashley Young as student #3; one of Brad’s students who is friends with Heather

== Production ==
The script was adapted from the book Front of the Class: How Tourette Syndrome Made Me the Teacher I Never Had by Brad Cohen and Lisa Wysockyby and the movie was directed by Peter Werner. Production was in Shreveport, Louisiana.

Following his 2006 appearance on The Oprah Winfrey Show, in 2007 Cohen spoke at a conference after Timothy Shriver of the Special Olympics. According to Shriver, "The audience 'was laughing, then crying, then laughing, then crying, then cheering, and at the end, they gave him a huge standing ovation.'" Shriver suggested the movie to Cohen and became the executive producer one year later.

To portray Cohen's tics accurately, James Wolk and Dominic Scott Kay viewed videotapes and worked with a dialect coach, describing their preparation as a "Tourette's boot camp". Cohen said the portrayal of his tics is "very, very authentic". Patricia Heaton, the mother of four children, was attracted to the script because she related to the strong mother: "Finally, she went to the library herself—as mothers will do to fight to the end for their kids and find out what's wrong—and realized he had Tourettes," Heaton explained.

Although tics steadily decline for most children as they pass through adolescence, Cohen still has frequent and loud vocal tics and barking. He joked: "I'm hoping I don't get kicked out of my own movie."

== Release ==
The movie was released on DVD in January 2009. A signed copy by author Brad Cohen was also released on DVD.

== Reception ==
Cohen was concerned that the movie should stay truthful and avoid sensationalizing Tourette syndrome. He was pleased with the overall result, although he noted some dates in his life were sped up for effect (for example, the date of his wedding).

== See also ==
- Hichki
