= Quit It =

2002 novel by Marcia Byalick

Quit It is a 2002 novel by Marcia Byalick about a young girl living with Tourette syndrome (TS). It was her first novel for Delacorte Press. The book centers on Carrie, a seventh-grade girl who has just been diagnosed with TS. Targeted to early teens, Quit It explores Carrie's struggles to cope with TS while trying to fit in with her peers.
