= Hichki =

2018 comedy drama film directed by Sidharth P. Malhotra

- Theatrical release poster
- Directed by: Siddharth P. Malhotra
- Written by: Ankur Chaudhry; Siddharth P. Malhotra; Ganesh Pandit; Raaj Mehta; Ambar Hadap
- Dialogues by: Anckur Chaudhry
- Based on: Front of the Class by Brad Cohen
- Produced by: Maneesh Sharma
- Starring: Rani Mukerji
- Cinematography: Avinash Arun
- Edited by: Shweta Venkat Matthew
- Music by: Songs: Jasleen Royal; Score: Hitesh Sonik
- Production company: Yash Raj Films
- Distributed by: Yash Raj Films
- Release date: 23 March 2018
- Running time: 116 minutes
- Country: India
- Language: Hindi
- Budget: ₹20 crore
- Box office: ₹209.72 crore

Hichki (pronounced [ɦɪtʃʰkɪ]; transl. Hiccup) is a 2018 Indian Hindi-language comedy drama film co-written and directed by Siddharth P. Malhotra. It is produced by Aditya Chopra and Maneesh Sharma under the banner of Yash Raj Films. Based on American motivational speaker Brad Cohen's autobiography Front of the Class, it stars Rani Mukerji as Naina Mathur, an aspiring teacher who gets rejected by many schools due to her Tourette syndrome, until she is accepted at the St. Notker's School, her alma mater. She is assigned to teach students from a nearby slum in the class 9F, which was created by the Government of India to fill a quota for the underprivileged.

Malhotra began scripting Hichki in 2013 upon acquiring the rights to Front of the Class. Principal photography took place in Mumbai between April and June 2017. The soundtrack and background score were composed by Jasleen Royal and Hitesh Sonik, respectively.

Hichki was released on 23 March 2018 to mixed reviews from critics who praised Mukerji's performance but criticised the plot's predictability. Made on a budget of ₹20 crore (US$2.1 million), the film was a major commercial success, grossing ₹209.72 crore (US$22 million) worldwide, making it Mukerji’s highest-grossing film. Mukerji received nominations for Best Actress at the Filmfare Awards, International Indian Film Academy Awards, Screen Awards, and Zee Cine Awards, and won an award of the same category at the Indian Film Festival of Melbourne, where it was screened. The film was also shown at the International Film Festival of India, the Shanghai International Film Festival, and the Giffoni Film Festival.

== Plot ==
Naina Mathur, a Bachelor of Education and Master of Science, aims to become a teacher, but is repeatedly rejected as she has Tourette's syndrome, which causes her to make uncontrollable sounds likened to hiccups. Despite failing for 5 years, she is supported by her mother, Sudha, and her younger brother, Vinay, while her father, Prabhakar, sees little potential in the idea and expects her to take up a banking job. Naina eventually receives an offer at St. Notker's School to teach class 9F. Once she is employed as a teacher, however, she realises that the school was desperate to find a new teacher for 9F, as all other teachers had failed to control the class. Naina finds that the students are unruly, misbehaved, and visibly different. Shyamlal, the school's peon, informs her that the 9F students come from a nearby slum and were admitted only to fill the government-prescribed quota for the underprivileged after a previous municipality school on the St. Notker's football ground was closed due to mounting maintenance costs.

On her first day, Naina's students imitate and mock her. She decides to teach them interactively, determined to show resilience. The students prank her with liquid nitrogen which explodes, shattering the windows. Naina prevents a mass expulsion by stating that the prank required planning, and if that can be guided, the class has potential. Wadia, the teacher of 9A, dislikes the 9F students. He informs Naina that his class comprises academically excellent prefects, but she assures him that her students will earn prefect badges as well. The school's annual science fair project is assigned to 9A. Meanwhile, Naina teaches her students to be brave in pursuing knowledge and to realise their individual strengths. Aatish, the sole student who remains cold towards Naina, sabotages 9A's science project. This is discovered by Wadia, and the principal decides to expel 9F. Again, Naina prevents it by promising that they will pass their exams, but is unable to prevent their suspension from attending school until then. Dejected, she informs them that they have shattered her efforts to help them.

Aatish faces ridicule from the rest of 9F and decides to apologise to Naina, and all of the 9F students study diligently. Shyamlal then supplies copies of the question paper to Aatish so that they would be able to cheat. When he presents the papers to his classmates, they refuse and he gives up on the idea as well. After the exam days, they pass but are accused of cheating when Shyamlal confesses to the plan, and the principal decides to expel them during the prefect-pinning ceremony. Akshay, one of the 9A students, reveals to Wadia that it was he who had bribed Shyamlal to supply the copies of the "wrong" question paper to 9F students, and Wadia realises that 9F students did not cheat. At the ceremony, Wadia announces that he wrongfully tried to fail the students and applauds Naina's teaching, requesting her to pin the prefect badges to her students who ranked first. After the ceremony, 9A and 9F put aside their differences and work together on a new science fair project which wins first place. The film ends with Naina's last day at the school after serving for 25 years, retiring as the school principal, as her former 9F students, who are all now successful, reunite with her.

== Cast ==
- Rani Mukerji as Naina Mathur, class teacher of 9F
  - Naisha Khanna as young Naina
- Supriya Pilgaonkar as Sudha Mathur, Naina's mother
- Sachin Pilgaonkar as Prabhakar Mathur, Naina's father
- Hussain Dalal as Vinay Mathur, Naina's younger brother
  - Vir Bhanushali as young Vinay
- Pankaj Anand as older Kilam
- Neeraj Kabi as Wadia, class teacher of 9A
- Vikram Gokhale as Principal Khan, former principal of St. Notker's School
- Harsh Mayar as Aatish, student of 9F
- Asif Basra as Shyamlal, peon of St. Notker's School
- Riya Shukla as Tara, student of 9F
- Sparsh Khanchandani as Oru, student of 9F
- Poorti Jai Agarwal as Tamanna, student of 9F
- Shagufta Shaikh as Shagufta, student of 9F
- Vikrant Soni as Killam, student of 9F
- Jayesh Kardak as Pankaj, student of 9F
- Benjamin Yangal as Ashwin, student of 9F
- Kalaivanan Kannan as Kalai, student of 9F
- Swaraj Kumar as Ravinder, student of 9F
- Siddhesh Pardhi as Omnish, student of 9F
- Rohit Suresh Saraf as Akshay Verma, student of 9A; Aatish's rival
- Ridhi Arora as Sunidhi Prabhakaran, student of 9A
- Jannat Zubair Rahmani as Natasha Khanna, student and topper of 9A; Aatish's crush
- Shiv Kumar Subramaniam as the school principal

== Production ==
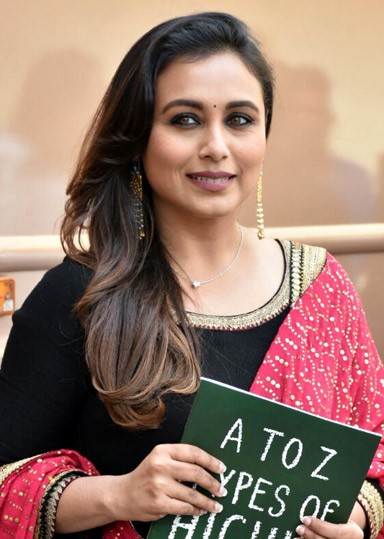
Hichki was Rani Mukerji's first film since the release of Mardaani (2014)

=== Development ===
In 2013, Siddharth P. Malhotra acquired the rights to Brad Cohen's 2005 autobiography Front of the Class and started writing the screenplay along with Ambar Hadap and Ganesh Pandit. The film was titled Hichki, which Malhotra felt was a suitable word for describing prejudice and social stigma against Tourette disorder. His second directorial venture after We Are Family (2010), Malhotra had several failed attempts to find a production house over four years. According to him, the production houses believed that the film lacked commercial viability, telling him: "Who would watch the story of a teacher suffering from Tourette syndrome?" Upon of the suggestion of his wife Sapna, he narrated the screenplay to Aditya Chopra, which the latter liked. Chopra, however, was busy with his directorial Befikre (2016) and asked Maneesh Sharma, who would co-produce Hichki with him, to listen to the rest.

=== Casting ===
While Malhotra had conceived of the film as a male-led film when writing the screenplay, Sharma suggested casting an actress as the lead. Rani Mukerji was chosen, marking her first acting role since Mardaani in 2014. She revealed that she accepted the film because she found the role to be more challenging than those in her previous films. Furthermore, Mukerji revealed that it was her husband Aditya Chopra who conceived her to portray the role as he saw her becoming obsessed with her family life and that her fans were desperately waiting for her comeback. She waited until her daughter Adira was four months old before accepting the role. In preparation, she interacted with Cohen (who was happy knowing the film would address Tourette syndrome and the character based on him) on the social media platform Skype, asking him for training to make her character's motor and vocal tics appear spontaneous and not rehearsed. Shanoo Sharma was the casting director.

=== Filming ===
Hichki was produced on a budget of ₹200 million (equivalent to ₹270 million or US$2.8 million in 2023). Principal photography began in Mumbai on 4 April 2017. Because this was her first on-screen project since her daughter's birth, Mukerji confessed that she was worried about leaving her daughter for the first time. Mukerji added, "... she had not spent even one day without me. Also, I was wondering whether I would be able to act or not as I was facing the camera after two years. I wondered if I still have it in me". Filming concluded on 5 June 2017 at Mehboob Studio, Mumbai.

== Soundtrack ==
The soundtrack was composed by Jasleen Royal with lyrics written by Raj Shekhar, Jaideep Sahni, Neeraj Rajawat, Aditya Sharma, and David Klyton. Abhishek Kurme, Arijit Singh, Benny Dayal, David Klyton, Harshdeep Kaur, Jasleen Royal, Naina Kundu, Nigel Rajaratnam, Rhiya Jauhari, Shilpa Rao, Siddesh Jammi, and Yogesh Kurme provided the vocals. The album was released by YRF Music on 19 February 2018.

== Marketing ==
Hichki was widely anticipated as it marked the comeback of Mukerji after four years. She promoted it on television in five languages: Bengali, Bhojpuri, Hindi, Marathi, and Punjabi. According to her, the film has inspired her by its moral message and relevancy, saying that she wanted more people in the country to hear it as well. The trailer was released on 19 December 2017.

The promotions of Hichki began on 14 January 2018, during the celebration of Makar Sankranti. Mukerji went to Ahmedabad to interact with school students and her fans, and later to eight other cities. She also promoted the film on several television shows, including Bigg Boss 11, Dadagiri Unlimited, and Dance India Dance. Mukerji continued it by interacting with the spiritual teacher Ravi Shankar at the inaugural session of the International Women's Conference. She spoke of her experience, "It will be amazing to be part of this session and hear him speak. Hichki is all about harnessing your positivity and inner peace to bring out the best in you and I'm going to speak about this in his presence. I look forward to this interactive session." In October, Mukerji visited five cities in China (Beijing, Chengdu, Guangzhou, Shanghai, and Shenzhen) to promote the film there.

== Release ==
=== Theatrical ===
Hichki was initially scheduled to release on 23 February 2018, however it was rescheduled to 23 March 2018 owing to post-exam season for students in India.

It was released on DVD in the NTSC widescreen format on 8 May 2018. The film was screened at the Shanghai International Film Festival on 15 June, the Indian Film Festival of Melbourne on 11 August, the International Film Festival of India in November, and the Giffoni Film Festival in July 2019. The film was released in theatres in China on 12 October under the title Teacher with Hiccup. It was released in Taiwan as My Teacher with Hiccups on 2 November.

=== Home media ===
Hichki was made available for streaming on Amazon Prime Video and Apple TV+.

== Reception ==
=== Critical response ===
Hichki received mixed reviews from critics who praised Mukerji's performance, but criticised the plot. On the review aggregator website Rotten Tomatoes, 60% of 15 critics' reviews are positive, with an average rating of 5.8/10.

Bollywood Hungama wrote that Mukerji had delivered an effervescent performance and made Hichki a good film despite a predictable story, believing she would make the audience empathise with her character and that the actress portrayed it zestfully. Sukanya Verma of Rediff.com gave 2.5 out of 5 stars panning the melodramatic screenplay but appreciated Mukerji and described the film as an "out-and-out" show for her. Mayank Shekhar, writing for Mid-Day, was critical of the film, calling it the desi version of the American coming-of-age drama Dead Poets Society (1989). Devesh Sharma of Filmfare thought Mukerji looked as if she had not taken a sabbatical from full-time acting, lauding her dramatic confrontational scenes with Neeraj Kabi, and Bhawana Somaaya expressed appreciation of her for playing against type.

Rachit Gupta of The Times of India said that she hoped the film focused not only on Naina's classroom struggle but also on her personal life, especially her conflict with her father. She, however, commended the performances of Mukerji and the actors who played her students, particularly that from Harsh Mayar. Rajeev Masand of News18 found Hichki to be inconsistent and unoriginal; however, he praised the film's moral message. Saibal Chatterjee of NDTV wrote "Rani Mukerji's energetic, engaging performance apart, Hichki is a huff-and-puff show marked by too much mush and fuss. But it has just enough to keep tearjerker junkies interested." Rohit Vats of the Hindustan Times rated the film two-and-a-half stars, complimenting Mukerji's straightforward, confident performance and those of Kabi and the student actors. However, Vats was disappointed that the film only revolves on the relationship between a teacher and students.

Richard James Havis of South China Morning Post found Mukerji's spirited performance enhancing an otherwise predictable story. Udita Jhunjhunwala of Scroll.in appreciated Malhotra for putting the narrative focus on Naina only without disruptive subplots, and Samrudhi Ghosh of India Today observed that Malhotra "had a tough task at hand—to stay away from emotional manipulation, even in the dramatic moments. He succeeds, for the most part; although some portions of the film, such as the climax, feel a little contrived." Another review in News18, written by Kriti Tulsiani, commented that the film is a remake of Peter Werner's 2008 film Front of the Class, which was based on the same book as Hichki, and criticised it for the inability to provide an original story and undramatic ending. Rohit Bhatnagar of the Deccan Chronicle gave the film 3 out of 5 stars, writing that Mukerji drives the film with her effortless performance; although the latter aspect make the film mediocre, he added that Hichki is as good as Malhotra's We Are Family. Chaya Unnikrishnan of the Daily News and Analysis termed Hichki a slice-of-life film with inspiring themes and was impressed by Mukerji's acting.

Namrata Joshi praised her tics used in the right measure and time, but noted the actors cast as her parents (Sachin and Supriya Pilgaonkar) did not get enough scope. Raja Sen and Aditya Shrikrishna from The New Indian Express said Mukerji was successful at making her tics look natural, and Anna M. M. Vetticad described the actress as one of the "biggest strengths" of Hichki. Billing it as a comeback vehicle for Mukerji, The Indian Express' Shalini Langer acclaimed Malhotra for not adding romantic songs or sequences. The Tamil magazine Ananda Vikatan named it as the best example of what teachers should teach to their students, with Anupama Chopra summarising, "[It] is a genuinely earnest film made with heart. But it doesn't take enough risks and consequently doesn't touch a raw nerve in the way that Taare Zameen Par did. But it's always nice to see a talented actress with all guns blazing." Swetha Ramakrishnan of Firstpost claimed Hichki would be not complete if Kabi did not feature in it.

=== Box office ===
The film was a commercial success in India and abroad, with the trade analyst Girish Johar telling The Indian Express that its business largely relied on the audience's word-of-mouth. However, he added that the issue of Tourette syndrome that is addressed in it may limit the audience. Released in more than 900 theatres, the film had a below average opening in India, grossing ₹33 million (US$340,000). After earning ₹200 million (US$2.1 million) in only five days, however, it was declared a commercial success. Hichki collected ₹591.3 million (US$6.1 million) over its theatrical run in India.

== Awards and nominations ==
Award/Organization	Category	Winner(s) and nominee(s)	Result	Ref(s)
Filmfare Awards	Best Actress	Rani Mukerji	Nominated	
Giffoni Film Festival	Best Film	Aditya Chopra, Maneesh Sharma	Won	
Indian Film Festival of Melbourne	Best Film	Aditya Chopra, Maneesh Sharma	Nominated	
Indian Film Festival of Melbourne	Best Director	Siddharth P. Malhotra	Nominated	
Indian Film Festival of Melbourne	Best Actress	Rani Mukerji	Won	
Indian Film Festival of Melbourne	Excellence in Cinema	Rani Mukerji	Won	
International Indian Film Academy Awards	Best Actress	Rani Mukerji	Nominated	
Screen Awards	Best Actress	Rani Mukerji	Nominated	
Zee Cine Awards	Best Actor – Female (Critics)	Rani Mukerji	Nominated	

== See also ==
- List of highest-grossing Indian films by international revenue
