= I Have Tourette's but Tourette's Doesn't Have Me =

2005 American television documentary

- DVD release cover
- Directed by: Ellen Goosenberg Kent
- Country of origin: United States

Production
- Producers: Ellen Goosenberg Kent; Beth Aala; Tourette Syndrome Association
- Cinematography: Buddy Squires
- Editor: Andrew Morreale
- Running time: 27 minutes

Original release
- Network: HBO
- Release: November 12, 2005

I Have Tourette's but Tourette's Doesn't Have Me is a 2005 documentary film featuring children between the ages of six and thirteen with Tourette syndrome. The film examines the lives of more than a dozen children who have Tourette's, and explores the challenges they face.

The 27-minute television documentary was produced by HBO in conjunction with the Tourette Syndrome Association (since renamed to TAA), and first aired on HBO on November 12, 2005. Ellen Goosenberg Kent is the director and producer, and Sheila Nevins is the executive producer.

Children with Tourette's Syndrome discuss the challenges of living with Tourette's, a misunderstood and often stigmatizing condition. They demonstrate some of their tics, and talk about their lives with tics including embarrassing and isolating situations at school and among friends. Professionals and experts offer further information about Tourette's on the DVD.

== Reception ==
Described by the Cincinnati Enquirer as "the best simple overview yet of Tourette's", it portrays "thoughtful and eloquent observations" of children coping with the condition.

== Awards ==
The documentary received the Emmy Award for Outstanding Children's Program, tying with the Disney Channel movie High School Musical. It was nominated for 2006 Emmy Awards in two categories: Outstanding Children's Program, and Outstanding Cinematography For Nonfiction Programming—Single-Camera Productions.

The documentary also won a Clarion Award from The Association for Women in Communications in the category "TV Children's Educational Program—Target Audiences ages 11 and up." It also won a Parents' Choice Award, a Voice Award from the Substance Abuse and Mental Health Services Administration (SAMHSA), and a Media Access Award, recognizing those who use their medium to increase public awareness and understanding.

It was also nominated for a Directors Guild of America award for Outstanding Directorial Achievement in Children's Programs.
