= SLITRK2 =

Protein-coding gene in the species Homo sapiens

Identifiers
- Aliases: SLITRK2, CXorf2, SLITL1, SLIT and NTRK like family member 2, CXorf1, TMEM257
- External IDs: OMIM: 300561; MGI: 2679449; GeneCards: SLITRK2

Gene location (Human)
Chr.	X chromosome (human)
Band	Xq27.3	Start	145,817,829 bp
Band	Xq27.3	End	145,829,856 bp

Gene location (Mouse)
Chr.	X chromosome (mouse)
Band	X|X A7.1	Start	65,692,924 bp
Band	X|X A7.1	End	65,704,999 bp
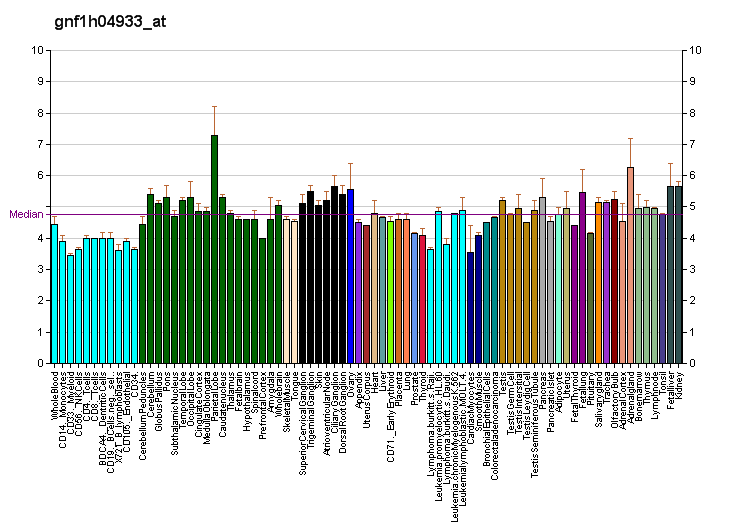

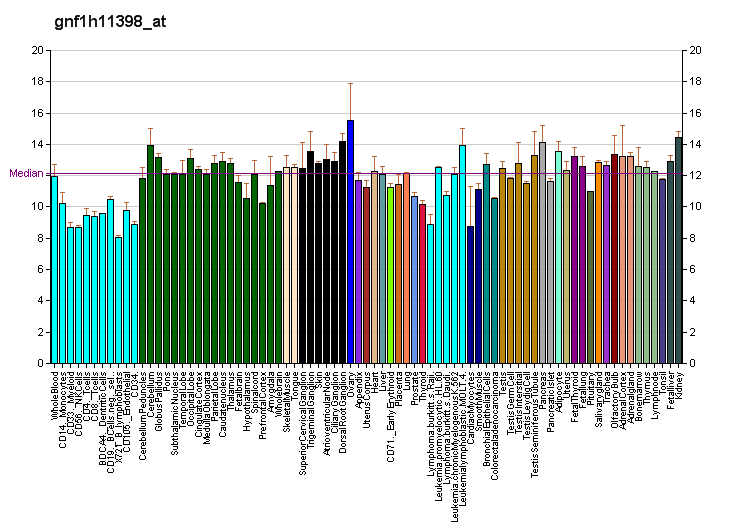

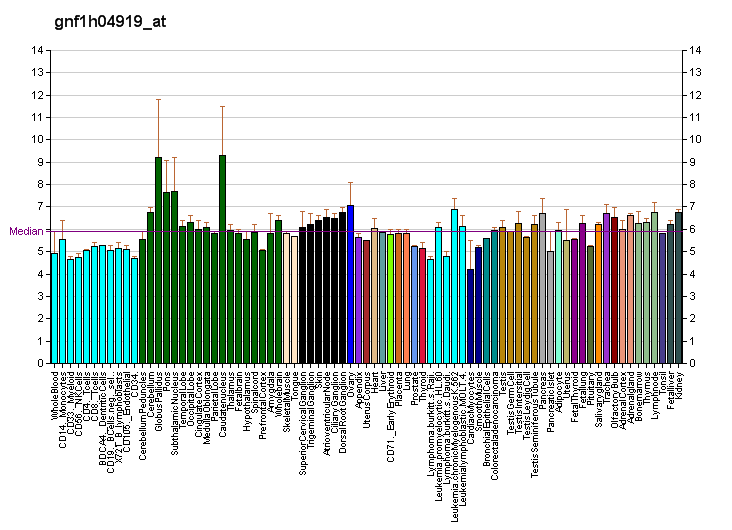
RNA expression pattern
Bgee	Human / Mouse (ortholog); Top expressed in: ventricular zone; internal globus pallidus; caudate nucleus; nucleus accumbens; ganglionic eminence; middle temporal gyrus; amygdala; right frontal lobe; putamen; C1 segment / Top expressed in: trigeminal ganglion; substantia nigra; lumbar subsegment of spinal cord; Region I of hippocampus proper; dentate gyrus; dentate gyrus of hippocampal formation granule cell; subiculum; ventricular zone; neural layer of retina; primary motor cortex; More reference expression data
BioGPS	More reference expression data
Orthologs
Databases	NCBI: entry; OMA: entry
Species	Human	Mouse
Entrez	84631	245450
Ensembl	ENSG00000185985	ENSMUSG00000036790
UniProt	Q9H156	Q810C0
RefSeq (mRNA)	NM_001144003; NM_001144004; NM_001144005; NM_001144006; NM_001144007 NM_001144008; NM_001144009; NM_001144010; NM_032539	NM_001161431; NM_198863
RefSeq (protein)	NP_001137475; NP_001137476; NP_001137477; NP_001137478; NP_001137480 NP_001137481; NP_001137482; NP_115928	NP_001154903; NP_942563
Location (UCSC)	Chr X: 145.82 – 145.83 Mb	Chr X: 65.69 – 65.7 Mb
PubMed search
- Wikidata
View/Edit Human	View/Edit Mouse

SLIT and NTRK-like protein 2 is a protein that in humans is encoded by the SLITRK2 gene.

== Function ==
Members of the SLITRK family, such as SLITRK2, are integral membrane proteins with 2 N-terminal leucine-rich repeat (LRR) domains similar to those of SLIT proteins (see SLIT1; MIM 603742). Most SLITRKs, including SLITRK2, also have C-terminal regions that share homology with neurotrophin receptors (see NTRK1; MIM 191315). SLITRKs are expressed predominantly in neural tissues and have neurite-modulating activity.
