= Arthur K. Shapiro =

American psychiatrist (1923–1995)

- Born: January 11, 1923; Brooklyn, New York, United States
- Died: June 3, 1995 (aged 72); White Plains, New York
- Education: City College of New York (B.A.; 1951); University of Chicago (M.D.; 1955)
- Years active: 1955–1995
- Known for: Important contributions to the understanding of Tourette Syndrome
- Medical career
- Profession: Medical doctor
- Institutions: Weill Cornell Medical College (1966–1977); Mount Sinai School of Medicine (1978–1995)
- Sub-specialties: Psychiatry

Arthur K. Shapiro, M.D., (January 11, 1923 – June 3, 1995) was an American psychiatrist and expert on Tourette syndrome. His "contributions to the understanding of Tourette syndrome completely changed the prevailing view of this disorder"; he has been described as "the father of modern tic disorder research" and is "revered by his colleagues as the first dean of modern Tourette syndrome researchers".

== Contributions to Tourette syndrome research ==
Until the early 1970s, the preferred intervention for Tourette syndrome was psychoanalysis. Shapiro wanted to prove that Tourette's was an organic disorder, and that psychotherapy was not the treatment of choice. "The turning point in the diagnosis and treatment of Tourette Syndrome occurred in 1965", when Dr. Shapiro and his wife, Elaine Schlaffer Shapiro (Ph.D.), treated a patient with haloperidol (Haldol). The Shapiros reported the treatment in a 1968 article, published by the British Journal of Psychiatry, after it was rejected by American journals. The paper "severely criticized" the psychoanalytic approach, which had endured throughout the previous century, to treating the condition.

Working with the New York patient families who founded the Tourette Syndrome Association (TSA, since renamed to TAA) in 1972, the Shapiros advanced the argument that Tourette's was neurological rather than psychological, and the medical view of Tourette syndrome was "freed from its century-long submission to discredited psychoanalytic theory". In 1978, the Shapiros published a "landmark book" on the disorder, Gilles de la Tourette Syndrome. (Note: The first edition was published in 1978; a second edition was published in 1988.) In 1981, Shapiro was chosen honorary co-president of the First International Tourette Syndrome Symposium, held in New York. Since the 1990s, a more neutral view of Tourette's is emerging as a condition involving an interaction between biological vulnerability and adverse environmental events.

A colleague, psychiatrist Ruth Bruun, described Arthur Shapiro as a revolutionary, "willing to challenge the prevailing dogma", "dynamic, charming, and relentlessly stubborn when fighting for what he thought was right", "an engaging speaker", and "a man of diverse interests and enthusiasm". Bruun also said, "It is extremely unusual for a couple of researchers to completely change the prevailing view of a disease, but this is exactly what they did."

== Personal life ==
Shapiro was born in Brooklyn, New York, and lived in Scarsdale, New York at the time of his death. He graduated in 1951 from City College of New York, obtained an MD in 1955 from the University of Chicago, was director of the Special Studies Laboratory at Cornell University until 1977, and was a physician at Mount Sinai School of Medicine.

Shapiro was a collector of medical antiquities. The Shapiros were married for 46 years, and "were obviously devoted to each other".

After Arthur's death from lung cancer at the age of 72, Elaine published their last joint effort, The Powerful Placebo: From Ancient Priest to Modern Physician.

Shapiro was survived by his wife, Elaine Schlaffer Shapiro, three children, a brother, and three grandchildren.

== Publications ==
- Shapiro, Arthur K., Shapiro, Elaine, Gerald Young, J., et al. (January 1988). Gilles De La Tourette Syndrome. Raven Press Ltd; 2nd edition. ISBN 978-0881673401
- Shapiro, Arthur K., Shapiro, Elaine (October 17, 2000). The Powerful Placebo : From Ancient Priest to Modern Physician. The Johns Hopkins University Press; New Ed edition. ISBN 978-0801855696
- Shapiro AK, Shapiro E (1992). "Evaluation of the reported association of obsessive-compulsive symptoms or disorder with Tourette's disorder". Compr Psychiatry. 33 (3): 152–65. doi:10.1016/0010-440X(92)90024-K. PMID 1591906.
- Shapiro E, Shapiro AK, Fulop G, et al. (August 1989). "Controlled study of haloperidol, pimozide and placebo for the treatment of Gilles de la Tourette's syndrome". Arch. Gen. Psychiatry. 46 (8): 722–30. doi:10.1001/archpsyc.1989.01810080052006. PMID 2665687.
- Shapiro AK, Shapiro E, Fulop G (June 1987). "Pimozide treatment of tic and Tourette disorders". Pediatrics. 79 (6): 1032–9. PMID 3295739.
- Shapiro E, Shapiro AK (1982). "Tardive dyskinesia and chronic neuroleptic treatment of Tourette patients". Adv Neurol. 35: 413. PMID 6959518.
