= Tourette Association of America =

U.S. non-profit organization

The Tourette Association of America (TAA), based in Bayside, New York, United States, is a non-profit voluntary organization and the only US health-related organization serving people with Tourette syndrome. It was founded in 1972 as the Tourette Syndrome Association (TSA), later changing its name.

== History ==
The TAA was founded in 1972 as the TSA by five couples, parents of children with Tourette syndrome including Bill and Eleanor Pearl, along with psychiatrist Arthur K. Shapiro and his wife, Elaine. In 2015, the organization's name was changed from TSA to TAA.

== Mission and structure ==
The TAA's mission is to identify the cause of, find the cure for and control the effects of Tourette syndrome. As of 2008, it had 35 US chapters, 300 support groups, and international contacts around the world.

== Activities ==
The TSA was "the major driving force in scientific and clinical progress relevant to TS", using its resources to encourage research and scientific initiatives, and working tirelessly to promote information about TS. It worked for recognition of Tourette syndrome as an organic disorder, lobbying the public, the government, and physicians. It is adept at winning grants and shaping media treatment of the condition. Since its inception, research spurred by the organization has grown in volume and sophistication, including controlled treatment studies and studies of pathophysiology and etiology. Many new research findings are the direct result of the organization's "active facilitation of large collaborative research consortia in genetics, neuro-imaging, clinical trials, and the behavioral sciences", and their "concerted effort to identify current research advances, disseminate them among the scientific and clinical communities, and establish networks of basic and clinical scientists from all over the world".

== Media ==
In 2005 HBO, in conjunction with the TSA, produced an Emmy Award-winning documentary film, I Have Tourette's but Tourette's Doesn't Have Me.
