= C815H1317N233O241S5 =

The molecular formula C_{815}H_{1317}N_{233}O_{241}S_{5} (molar mass: 18396.1 g/mol) may refer to:

- Darbepoetin alfa
- Epoetin alfa
