= 1919–1930 encephalitis lethargica epidemic =

1918–1930 Encephalitis lethargica epidemic
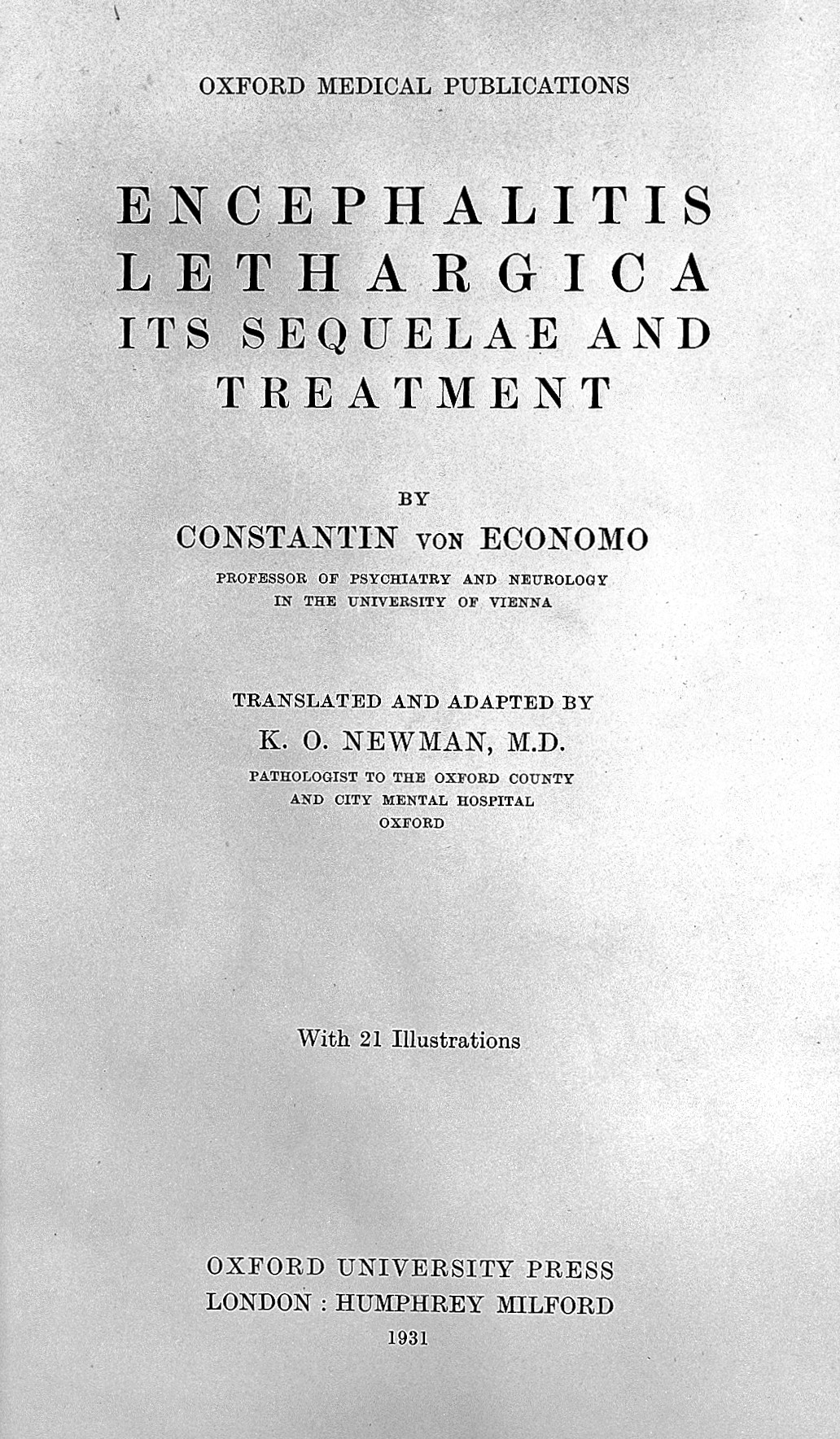
- Title page of Encephalitis Lethargica, Economo, 1931
- Deaths: 20% mortality

The epidemic of encephalitis lethargica lasted from around 1918 to 1930. The cause is still unknown. Though the cause was once attributed to the coinciding Spanish flu epidemic, modern research has disputed this claim. The mortality was as high as 20%.

The epidemic is thought to have started in Romania during 1915, and the disease supposedly spread through the movement of the various troops during World War I. In 1917, it reached the epidemic status in Vienna, where it was first described. Disease outbreaks of encephalitis were first reported in England and France during 1918, followed by Canada, Central America, India, and the United States in 1919. Disease outbreaks were also reported in Germany and the Soviet Union during 1920. The epidemic peaked between 1920 and 1929, with an estimated one million people diagnosed with encephalitis lethargica during the epidemic period. The disease suddenly disappeared in the beginning of the 1930s.

In the aftermath of the epidemic, many cases of post-encephalitic parkinsonism were reported. This condition was distinctive from idiopathic Parkinson's disease, as it occurs in younger patients than typical idiopathic Parkinson's disease, and lacks the "pill-rolling tremor" of idiopathic Parkinson's disease.

== Background ==
Encephalitis lethargica is a neurological syndrome that causes lethargy, a "mask like" face, excessive blood in the meninges, and other general neurological symptoms. Officially recognized as its own condition in 1917, it is believed to have existed far longer in human history. It is known to cause post-encephalitic parkinsonism.

== Timeline ==
According to Urechia (1921), the pandemic possibly started in 1915, Romania. It is believed that the disease spread through the movement of the troops during World War I. In 1917, it reached the epidemic status in Vienna, where it was first described. It was followed by France and England in 1918. In 1919, the disease was present in Europe, the US, Canada, Central America, and India. In 1920, the disease was present in the Soviet Union and Germany.

Neurologist Constantin von Economo published a paper in April 1917 on six cases he encountered in the winter months of 1916 and 1917 in the Psychiatric-Neurological Clinic of the University of Vienna. These patients, despite their various previous diagnoses, had a similar pattern of symptoms. This led him to suggest a novel disease, which he named Encephalitis lethargica. In France, physician René Cruchet was encountering similar patterns, and published his findings within a few days of Constantin von Economo. Following these two reports, many more cases were reported, first in Europe, but quickly spreading around the globe. Reviews from both works considers Economo as the first to describe the disease, while Cruchet reported a group of heterogeneous conditions. Initially, encephalitis lethargica main symptoms were described as somnolence and lethargy, but after 1919 cases of insomnia and hyperkinesia appeared. Economo also described hiccups as a symptom, which was later linked to the hyperkinetic–insomniac variety of encephalitis lethargica, but no case between 1920 and 1930 showed this symptom. Endocrine symptoms, such as diabetes, were only present in cases described between 1922 and 1923.

Following von Economo description of the disease, many speculated that it had the same cause as the Spanish flu. Many poorly conducted experiments pointed to that hypothesis, but in 1923 Simon Flexner highlighted the problems with the investigations.

William Matheson founded the Matheson Commission in 1927, promising to find a cure to encephalitis lethargica within two years. They worked with two main hypothesis, that encephalitis lethargica was a form of herpes or it was a focal infection resulting from a neurotropic form of Streptococcus viridans. The commission ended in 1940 without finding the cure, but it produced data about the disease.

The epidemic peaked between 1920 and 1929, with an estimated million people diagnosed with encephalitis lethargica during the epidemic period. In the beginning of 1930s, the disease suddenly disappeared, and the attention of the medical community changed to more pressing matters. During the pandemic, approximately 9000 papers about encephalitis lethargica were published.

== Causes ==
The causes of encephalitis lethargica are still unknown. Though the connection to the Spanish flu epidemic is often made, the encephalitis outbreak did begin slightly earlier. However, this cannot disprove the claim, simply point out that not all of the existing evidence lines up.

== Aftermath ==
In the aftermath of the epidemic, many cases of post-encephalitic parkinsonism were reported. This condition was distinctive from idiopathic Parkinson's disease, as it occurs in younger patients than typical idiopathic Parkinson's disease, and lacks the "pill-rolling tremor" of idiopathic Parkinson's disease.

Estimates of the number of people infected varies greatly, from a thousand to a million. The estimated mortality varies between 15% and 40%. It is estimated that 50–75% of cases went unreported. At the same time, the number of reported cases may have been inflated by overdiagnosis due to the description of generic symptoms and lack of established diagnostic criteria.

== Popular culture ==
=== Books ===
- Crosby, Molly Caldwell: Asleep: the Forgotten Epidemic That Remains One of Medicine's Greatest Mysteries (2010)

=== Other works ===
Both Sandman comic books and series depict the epidemic. In the story, Dream is locked against his will, thus causing his realm to collapse and the epidemic to start.

The after effects of the pandemic are addressed in the film Awakenings.
