= Encephalitis lethargica =

Form of encephalitis (sleeping sickness)

- Other names: Economo's disease; von Economo's encephalitis
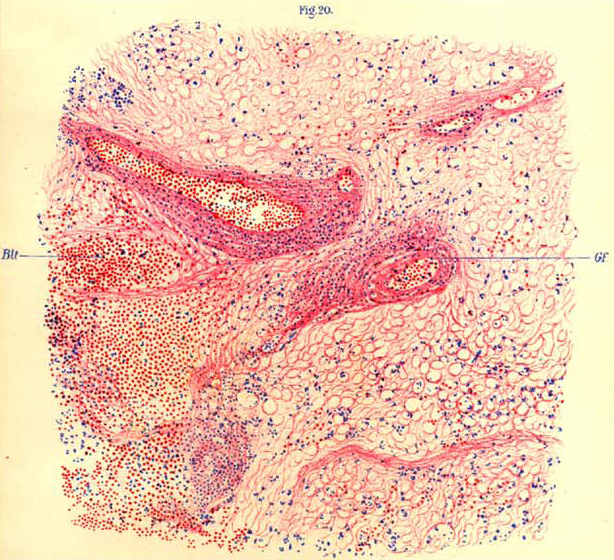
- An illustration from von Economo's Die Encephalitis lethargica (1918) showing brain tissue of a monkey affected by encephalitis lethargica, as seen under a microscope
- Specialty: Infectious diseases, neurology
- Causes: Unknown
- Frequency: Rare
- Deaths: 500,000+ (Post-epidemic)

Encephalitis lethargica (EL) is an atypical form of encephalitis. Also known as "von Economo Encephalitis", "sleeping sickness" or "sleepy sickness" (distinct from tsetse fly–transmitted sleeping sickness), it was first described in 1917 by neurologist Constantin von Economo and pathologist Jean-René Cruchet. The disease attacks the brain, leaving some victims in a statue-like condition, speechless and motionless. Between 1915 and 1926, an epidemic of encephalitis lethargica spread around the world. The exact number of people infected is unknown, but it is estimated that more than one million people contracted the disease during the epidemic, which directly caused more than 500,000 deaths. Most of those who survived never recovered their pre-morbid vigor.

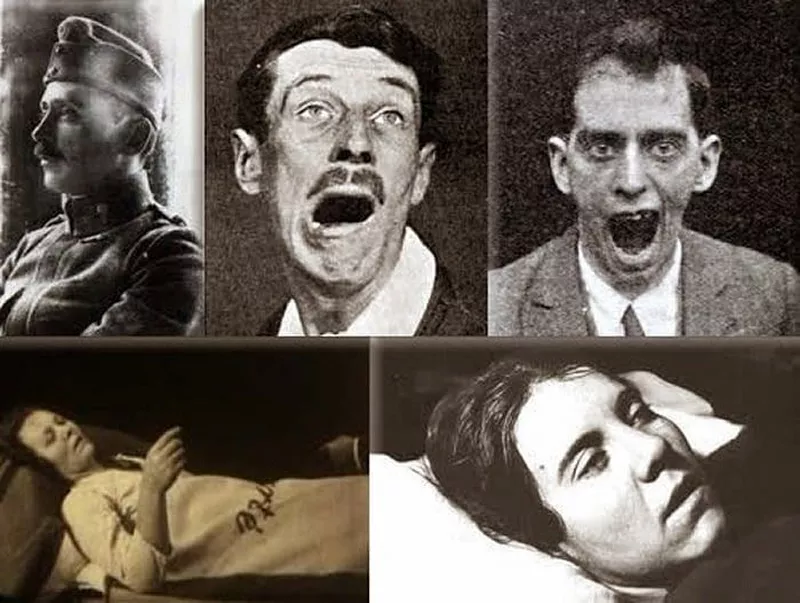
Neurologist Constantin von Economo (upper left photo) and the patients

== Signs and symptoms ==
Encephalitis lethargica is characterized by high fever, sore throat, headache, lethargy, double vision, delayed physical and mental response, sleep inversion and catatonia. In severe cases, patients may enter a coma-like state (akinetic mutism). Patients may also experience abnormal eye movements ("oculogyric crises"), Parkinsonism, upper body weakness, muscular pains, tremors, neck rigidity, and behavioral changes including psychosis. Klazomania, a vocal tic involving compulsive screaming, is sometimes present.

Approximately a third of the affected children experienced change of behavior, with many of them becoming "delinquents". Boys between the ages of 5 and 18 years were the most affected. Symptoms include change of personality, restlessness, irregular sleeping habits, emotional instability manifesting as irritability, crying spells, and temper tantrums, including impulsivity, and unpredictability, what Economo described as "moral insanity". More extreme cases include aggression and "shameless sexual activity". Children under the age of 5 years suffered severe developmental delays. Delays were also present in children between 5 and 14 years of age, even though the claims are controversial.

It is estimated that 25–90% of adults also suffered from psychological problems, including hysteria and abnormal behavior and movement. A large minority of patients described having bradyphrenia.

== Cause ==
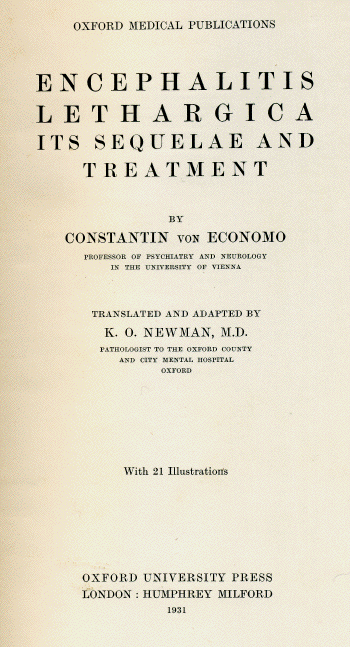
Encephalitis lethargica. Its sequelae and treatment – Constantin von Economo, 1931: front page

The causes of encephalitis lethargica are uncertain. Though it used to be believed that it was connected to the Spanish flu epidemic, modern research provides arguments against this claim. Some studies have explored its origins in an autoimmune response, and separately, or with an immune response, links to pathologies of infectious disease – viral and bacterial, such as in the case of influenza, where a link with encephalitis is clear. Postencephalitic Parkinsonism was clearly documented to have followed an outbreak of encephalitis lethargica following the 1918 influenza pandemic; evidence for viral causation of the Parkinson's symptoms is circumstantial (epidemiologic, and finding influenza antigens in encephalitis lethargica patients), while evidence arguing against this cause is of the negative sort (for example, lack of viral RNA in postencephalitic Parkinsonian brain material).

In reviewing the relationship between influenza and encephalitis lethargica (EL), McCall and co-authors conclude, as of 2008, that "the case against influenza [is] less decisive than currently perceived ... [yet] there is little direct evidence supporting influenza in the etiology of EL," and that "[a]lmost 100 years after the EL epidemic, its etiology remains enigmatic." Hence, while opinions on the relationship of encephalitis lethargica to influenza remain divided, the preponderance of literature appears skeptical.

The German neurologist Felix Stern, who examined hundreds of encephalitis lethargica patients during the 1920s, noted that their encephalitis lethargica typically evolved over time:

- The early symptoms would be dominated by sleepiness or wakefulness.
- A second symptom would lead to an oculogyric crisis.
- The third symptom would be recovery, followed by a Parkinson-like syndrome.

If patients of Stern followed this course of disease, he diagnosed them with encephalitis lethargica. Stern suspected encephalitis lethargica to be close to poliomyelitis, but had no evidence. Nevertheless, he experimented with the convalescent serum of survivors of the first acute syndrome. He vaccinated patients with early-stage symptoms, telling them that it might be successful. Stern is the author of the definitive book, Die Epidemische Encephalitis.

In 2010, in a substantial compendium reviewing the historic and contemporary views on EL, a researcher writing in 1930 was quoted, "we must confess that etiology is still obscure, the causative agent still unknown, the pathological riddle still unsolved." The following conclusion was offered:

Does the present volume solve the "riddle" of EL, which ... has been referred to as the greatest medical mystery of the 20th century? Unfortunately, no: but inroads are certainly made here pertaining to diagnosis, pathology, and even treatment.

After the publication of this compendium, an enterovirus was discovered in encephalitis lethargica cases from the epidemic. In 2012, Oliver Sacks, the author of the book Awakenings, about institutionalized survivors, acknowledged this virus as the probable cause of the disease. Other sources have suggested Streptococcus pneumoniae as a cause.

== Diagnosis ==
There have been several proposed diagnostic criteria for encephalitis lethargica. One, which has been widely accepted, includes an acute or subacute encephalitic illness where all other known causes of encephalitis have been excluded. Another diagnostic criterion, suggested more recently, says that the diagnosis of encephalitis lethargica "may be considered if the patient's condition cannot be attributed to any other known neurological condition and that they show the following signs: influenza-like signs; hypersomnolence (hypersomnia), wakeability, ophthalmoplegia (paralysis of the muscles that control the movement of the eye), and psychiatric changes". Others describe lethargy, "mask-like faces", excess blood in the meninges, and other general neurological symptoms.

== Treatment ==
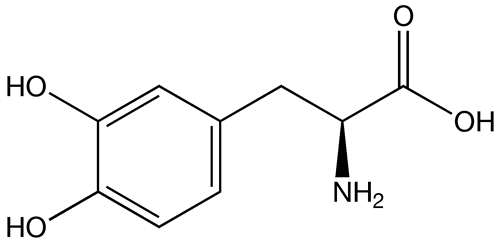
L-DOPA

Modern treatment approaches to encephalitis lethargica include immunomodulating therapies and treatments to remediate specific symptoms.

There is little evidence so far of a consistent effective treatment for the initial stages, though some patients given steroids have seen improvement. The disease becomes progressive, with evidence of brain damage similar to that of Parkinson's disease.

Treatment is then symptomatic. L-DOPA (Levodopa) and other anti-Parkinson drugs often produce dramatic responses; however, most people given L-DOPA experience improvements that are short-lived.

== History ==
=== Occurrences ===
Retrospective diagnosis tentatively suggests various historical outbreaks of encephalitis lethargica:

- In 1580, Europe was swept by a serious febrile and lethargic illness that led to Parkinsonism and other neurological sequelae.
- From 1673 to 1675, a similar serious epidemic occurred in London, which Thomas Sydenham described as "febris comatosa".
- In 1695, a 20-year-old woman in Germany experienced oculogyric crises, Parkinsonism, diplopia, strabismus, and other symptoms following an attack of somnolent brain fever, as described by Albrecht of Hildesheim.
- In 1712–1713, a severe epidemic of Schlafkrankheit ('sleep sickness') occurred in Tübingen, Württemberg, followed in many cases by persistent slowness of movement and lack of initiative (aboulia).
- Between 1750 and 1800, France and Germany experienced minor epidemics of "coma somnolentum" with features of Parkinsonism, including hyperkinetic hiccup, myoclonus, chorea, and tics.
- Between 1848 and 1882, Paris-based neurologist Jean-Martin Charcot documented many isolated cases of juvenile Parkinsonism, associated with diplopia, oculogyria, tachypnoea, retropulsion, and obsessional disorders, which were almost certainly post-encephalitic in origin.
- In 1890 in Italy, following the influenza epidemic of 1889–1890, a severe epidemic of somnolent illnesses (nicknamed the "Nona") appeared. For the few survivors of the Nona, Parkinsonism and other sequelae developed in almost all cases.
- Between 1915 and 1927, a world-wide encephalitis lethargica pandemic occurred, impacting nearly 5 million people and killing an estimated 1.6 million people.

=== Pandemic of 1915–1927 ===
In the winter of 1916–1917, a "new" illness suddenly appeared in Vienna and other cities, and rapidly spread worldwide over the next three years. Earlier reports appeared throughout Europe as early as the winter of 1915–1916, but communication about the disease was slow and chaotic, given the varied manifestation of symptoms and difficulties disseminating information in wartime; it was officially recognized as a distinct disease in 1917. Some authors define the span of the outbreak as being from 1918 to 1930.

Neurologist Constantin von Economo published a paper in April 1917 describing some of the cases he encountered in the winter months of 1916–1917. These patients, despite varying diagnoses, had a similar pattern of symptoms which led von Economo to suggest a novel disease, which he called Encephalitis Lethargica. In France, physician Jean-René Cruchet was experiencing something similar, and he published his findings within a few days of von Economo.After these two, many more reports began being released about the disease, starting in Europe before moving around the globe.

Until Constantin von Economo identified a unique pattern of damage among the brains of deceased patients and introduced the unifying name encephalitis lethargica, reports of the protean disease came in under a range of names: botulism, toxic ophthalmoplegia, epidemic stupor, epidemic lethargic encephalitis, acute polioencephalitis, Heine-Medin disease, bulbar paralysis, hystero-epilepsy, acute dementia, and sometimes just "an obscure disease with cerebral symptoms". Just 10 days before von Economo's breakthrough in Vienna, Jean-René Cruchet described 40 cases of "subacute encephalomyelitis" in France.

The number of people infected during the ten years of the pandemic is unknown, but it is estimated that more than 1 million people contracted the disease, which directly caused more than 500,000 deaths. Encephalitis lethargica assumed its most virulent form between October 1918 and January 1919.

In the United States, the epidemic peaked from 1920 to 1924. It is estimated that as many as one million people were diagnosed with encephalitis lethargica during the epidemic period.

The pandemic disappeared in 1927, as abruptly and mysteriously as it first appeared. The great encephalitis pandemic coincided with the 1918 influenza pandemic, and the influenza virus likely potentiated the effects of the causative agent of the encephalitis or lowered resistance to it in a catastrophic way.

==== Aftermath ====
Many survivors of the 1915–1927 pandemic seemed to make a complete recovery and return to their normal lives. However, the majority of survivors subsequently developed neurological or psychiatric disorders, often after years or decades of seemingly perfect health.

Post-encephalitic syndromes varied widely: sometimes they proceeded rapidly, leading to profound disability or death; sometimes very slowly; sometimes they progressed to a certain point and then stayed at this point for years or decades; and sometimes, following their initial onslaught, they remitted and disappeared. It is also known to cause postencephalitic parkinsonism (PEP). Though often thought of as a disease of the past, it is still seen in occasional cases today.

== Notable cases ==
Notable cases include:

- Muriel "Kit" Richardson (née Hewitt), first wife of actor Sir Ralph Richardson, died of the condition in October 1942, having first shown symptoms in 1927–1928.
- There is speculation that Adolf Hitler may have had encephalitis lethargica when he was a young adult (in addition to the more substantial case for Parkinsonism in his later years).
- Mervyn Peake (1911–1968), author of the Gormenghast books, began his decline towards death which was initially attributed to encephalitis lethargica with Parkinson's disease–like symptoms, although others have later suggested his decline in health and eventual death may have been due to Lewy body dementia.
- Those described in the book Awakenings by the British neurologist Oliver Sacks.
- Jane Norton Grew Morgan, wife of J. P. Morgan Jr., died of encephalitis lethargica in 1925. At the time, doctors attributed her encephalitis to having contracted influenza during the 1918 pandemic.

== See also ==
- Idiopathic disease
- Idiopathic chronic fatigue
- Chronic fatigue syndrome
- Fever of unknown origin
