= Klazomania =

Compulsive shouting

Klazomania (from Greek κλάζω, klazo 'scream') refers to compulsive shouting; it has features resembling the complex tics such as echolalia, palilalia and coprolalia seen in tic disorders, but has been seen in people with encephalitis lethargica, alcohol use disorder, and carbon monoxide poisoning. It was first reported by László (Ladislaus) Benedek in 1925 in a patient with postencephalitic parkinsonism. Little is known about the condition, and few cases have been reported.

== Classification ==
Klazomania shares some features with vocal tics seen in tic disorders including Tourette syndrome (TS). Klazomania was described in a 2006 journal review as a cause of tics differentiated from TS (tourettism), attributed to infectious processes (encephalitis) rather than TS. A 1996 case report on one patient by Bates et al. suggested klazomania was a vocal tic.

== Signs and symptoms ==
Klazomania is similar to other complex tics including echolalia, palilalia and coprolalia. It is defined as compulsive shouting, which can be in the form of swearing, grunting or barking. The subject may appear flushed, and klazomania can occur with increasing frequency if the person is agitated. The duration of the incident depends on the individual, but it can be characterized by a peak period, followed by intermittent remissions of less intensity. Although the individual may sound like they are in pain, there does not appear to be any actual physical discomfort. The shouting can be accompanied by other symptoms, such as oculogyric crises or other involuntary movements. The presentation of klazomania has been compared to temporal lobe epilepsy, although the two can be distinguished by the duration of the attack and the fact that the patient experiencing klazomania appears to retain consciousness.

A 1961 report by Wohlfart described a postman known as K.R. who contracted encephalitis lethargica at the age of 12. While he reported no significant ill effects from the disease, he was irritable and complained of fatigue for years after recovering. At 22, the patient received a head injury, though he did not sustain a concussion or cranial fracture from the incident. Six months later, he developed oculogyric spasms, as well as dyskinesias of the mouth and tongue. At the age of 44, the patient experienced his first bout of klazomania. He remained conscious for the entire incident, while he shouted for about half an hour and appeared "crazy" for hours after the shouting ended. The next day, he felt better, though he did report being tired. The patient continued to suffer from the attacks for the next few years before coming under observation of Wohlfart and colleagues. He subsequently served as a model to describe klazomania from beginning to end.

According to Wohlfart's account of one patient, onset is sometimes characterized by absentmindedness: the patient K.R. stared straight ahead and only responded in monosyllables in the minutes leading up to the incident. An oculogyric spasm then developed, during which he demonstrated echolalia. After 15 minutes, further motor symptoms arose, with the patient making small jerky motions with his arms that developed into larger, circular movements. At 20 minutes, the attack reached its peak, with the patient becoming bright red and making large compulsive movements with his arms and kicking his legs. He began swearing, shouting, screaming, grunting and barking loudly, with intermittent bouts of heavy panting. He remarked upon the people present, with his comments being related to the situation in question. He attempted at times to excuse his behavior. Afterwards the patient was able to provide an account of what had happened. Wohlfart et al. concluded that the patient was aware of his surroundings during the attack, with the patient even expressing concern over missing a scheduled appointment; the patient demonstrated some ability to control his behavior when spoken to in a sharp tone, but he would inevitably return to his shouting and movements after a few seconds of stillness. The episode lasted an hour and a half and was accompanied by salivation, sweating, and tachycardia. The peak of the attack lasted 30 minutes; the intensity then started to subside, though the patient still exhibited bouts of shouting and movement after several minutes of remission. The remission periods between the shouting episodes became longer, until the entire attack was over in about an hour and a half.

== Causes ==
Although the cause of klazomania is unknown, it is considered to be associated with encephalitis lethargica; a 2006 journal review by Jankovic and Mejia attributes klazomania to tourettism (tics not due to Tourette syndrome), widely seen after the encephalitic lethargica pandemic of 1916 to 1927.

Wohlfart (1961) hypothesized that klazomania is caused by an irritating lesion in the mesencephalon and a malfunction in the control of the motor circuit from the substantia nigra in the mesencephalon to the globus pallidus in the striatum (mesostraital pathway). This circuit becomes overstimulated during a mesencephalic "fit".

In a 1996 report of one case, Bates et al. postulated that klazomania is similar to the vocal tics of Tourette syndrome, although patients with klazomania may not have the motor tics necessary for a diagnosis of TS. Bates and colleagues observed a case where alcohol use disorder and encephalitis were accompanied by vocal tics and occasionally klazomania. They hypothesized that the cause of klazomania is linked to the combined effects of brain damage due to alcohol use disorder or encephalitis.

== Pathophysiology ==
Jankovic and Mejia's 2006 review indicated that autopsies of victims of the 1917 to 1926 encephalitis lethargica pandemic revealed "neurofibrillary tangles and neuronal loss in the globus pallidus, hypothalamus, midbrain tegmentum, periaqueductal gray matter, striatum, and the substantia nigra".

Wohlfart et al. hypothesized that klazomania originates in the periaqueductal gray matter in the mesencephalon. The vocalizing center in animals is located in the periaqueductal gray matter and a klazomania-like episode involving grunts and animal sounds can be evoked by electrical stimulation of this region. Wohlfart and colleagues hypothesized that the stimulation of the autonomic nervous system by the posterior hypothalamus is involved in klazomania, adding that klazomania resembles sham rage in animals, which is controlled by stimulation of the sympathetic nervous system. During klazomania, a person may experience pupil dilation, tachycardia, salivation, increased blood pressure, retraction of lips, barking, grunting, and rage just as an animal would if presenting sham rage. Bates and colleagues (1996) say that neuroimaging and pathology results do not support evidence of hypothalamic involvement similar to that found in sham rage.

== Diagnosis ==
Jankovic and Mejia describe klazomania as due to tourettism (tics having Tourette syndrome-like features but not due to TS). According to the revised fourth edition of the Diagnostic and Statistical Manual of Mental Disorders (DSM-IV-TR), Tourette's may be diagnosed when the other diagnostic criteria are met and symptoms cannot be attributed to another general medical condition. Hence, other medical conditions that include tics or tic-like movements—such as tourettism—must be ruled out before a TS diagnosis can be conferred. There are no specific tests; the diagnosis is based on history and symptoms.

According to Bates (1996), electroencephalography (EEG) abnormalities are not observed during klazomania, and a link between klazomania and seizures is not likely.

== Treatment ==
In large doses, atropine sulfate helped control the involuntary movements associated with klazomania in one patient; attempts to treat with a combination of phenobarbital and trihexyphenidyl (also known as Artane) were also made. Phenobarbital acts as an anticonvulsant and is generally used to treat seizures, while Artane is used to treat involuntary movements in Parkinson's disease; however, this combination was found to have no beneficial effect in treating klazomania. Klazomania does not respond to anti-epileptic medications.

== History ==
The word klazomania comes from the Greek κλάζω, klazo 'scream'. The term was coined by László (Ladislaus) Benedek in 1925 when he witnessed bouts of compulsive shouting in a patient with postencephalitic parkinsonism. He reported that the attacks would last for up to several hours and seemed to be outside of the patient's control. He characterized the shouting as extremely loud, noting that it could be in the form of syllables, vowels or even animal noises. In addition, he observed that while the nature of the shouting could suggest that the patient was in pain, the sounds themselves were unrelated to any physical discomfort. He stated that the patient appeared to have the ability to anticipate an incident and could even prevent it through deep and rapid breathing. However, he noted that the effort required to suppress klazomania could be even more tiring than enduring it. He said that though anxiety could increase the frequency of klazomania, it did not affect the overall presentation.

Two of Benedek's colleagues, Jenő Thurzó (a.k.a. Eugen von Thurzó) and Tibor Katona, recorded two further instances of klazomania in 1927. They expanded upon Benedek's earlier observations, describing the angry flushed face of one patient, as well as extreme restlessness and agitation. They noted that afterwards the patient apologized for the incident, suggesting awareness of the behavior. From this, Thurzó and Katona proposed that there is no loss of consciousness during klazomania and that individuals may remain fully aware of their surroundings.

One of the first instances in which an infectious disease was associated with klazomania was the notable pandemic of the encephalitis lethargica from 1916 to 1927. This pandemic also gave rise to observations of other tics that came to be associated with encephalitis lethargica such as complex vocalizations of blocking, echolalia, palilalia, and oculogyric crises.

In 1961, Wohlfart et al. reported a case of klazomania accompanied by oculogyric crises, another symptom of postencephalitic Parkinsonian syndrome. Klazomania was proposed to be associated with long-term excessive use of alcohol and carbon monoxide poisoning in 1996. Bates et al. reported on a 63-year-old who was admitted to a psychiatric hospital with a two-year history of sudden episodes of shouting. The man claimed to have no memory of the attacks, which he could anticipate by a few seconds. The episodes were characterized by shouting of "aagh" or "help" and he was reported to appear angry during the incidents. At the end of the outbursts he would appear surprised, though he was able to continue a conversation. The patient remained fully oriented between attacks. The episodes themselves occurred at a frequency of one or two a month, generally taking place in the evening and they got progressively worse from the time of their first presentation.

The observation of klazomania in encephalitis patients helped establish the neurological underpinning of tics in other conditions, including Tourette syndrome.
