= Jean-René Cruchet =

French pathologist (1875–1959)

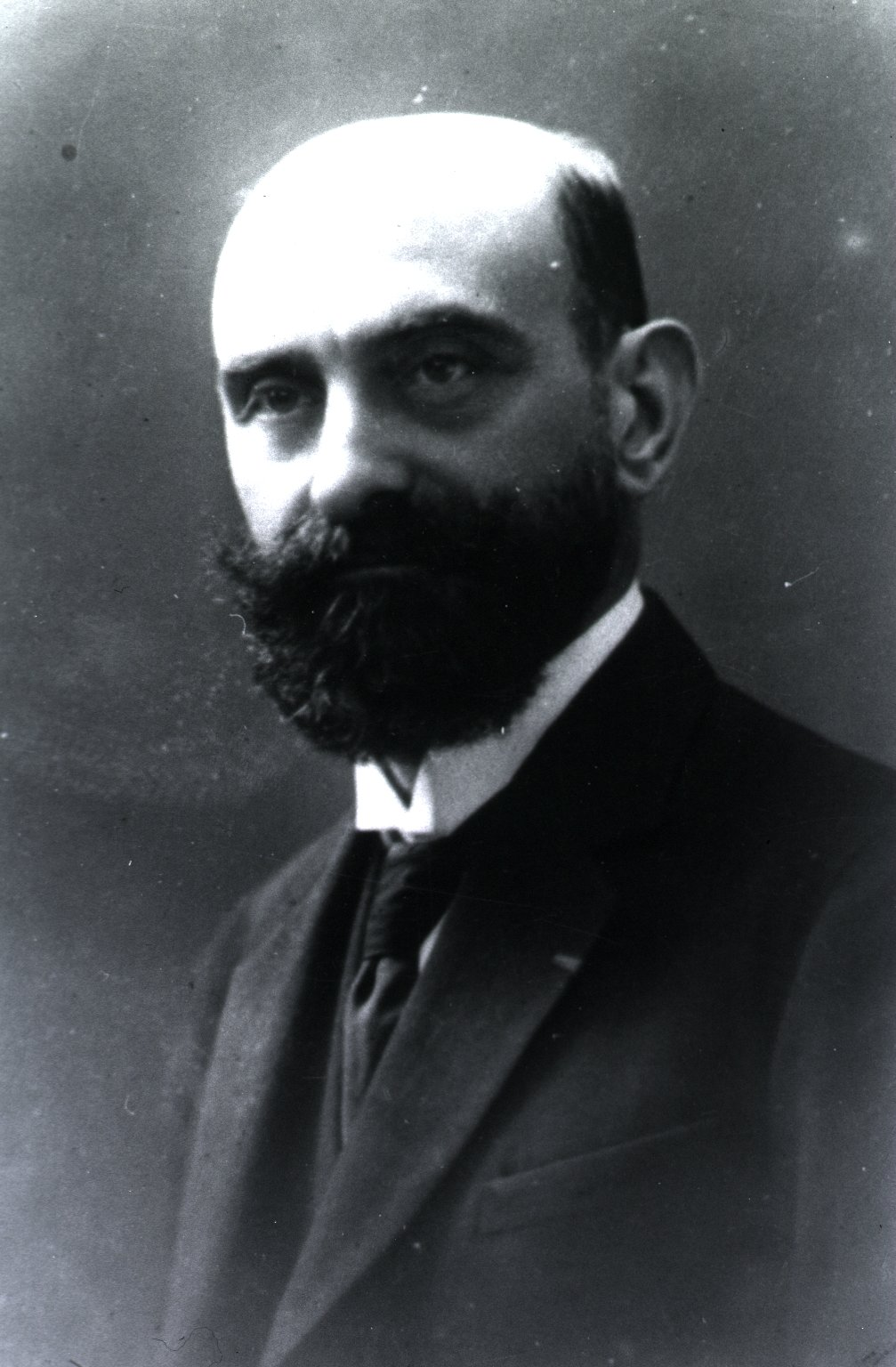
Jean-René Cruchet (1875–1959)

Jean-René Cruchet (21 March 1875, Bordeaux – 14 April 1959, Bordeaux) was a French pathologist.

== Education and career ==
In 1902 he obtained his medical doctorate at the University of Bordeaux and subsequently became chef de clinique médicale. In 1907 he received his habilitation and became médecin des hôpitaux. He became a professor of general pathology in 1920, and in 1926 attained the chair of pediatrics at Bordeaux.

Cruchet is remembered for his research of spasmodic torticollis. In 1907 he published Traité des torticolis spasmodiques, an influential monograph in which he documented 357 cases of torticollis. He also conducted investigations on tic disorders and studies of motion sickness experienced by aviators.

In the winter of 1915–16 he was the first physician to give a report on encephalitis lethargica (Economo's disease). He first noticed the presence of the disease in French soldiers at Verdun. Historically encephalitis lethargica was referred to as "Cruchet's disease".

== Selected publications ==
- Étude critique sur le tic convulsif et son traitement gymnastique (Critical study on convulsive tics and their treatment), 1901–02
- Traité des torticolis spasmodiques (Treatise on spasmodic torticollis), 1907
- Le mal des aviateurs (Aviator sickness) 1919 with R. Moulinier in Les actualités médicales; later translated into English.
- Méningites chroniques et idiotie (Chronic meningitis and idiocy) In Nouveau traité de médecine et de thérapeutique of Augustin Nicolas Gilbert (1858–1927) and Paul Carnot (1869–1957)
- L’encéphalite épidémique (Epidemic encephalitis), 1928.
