= Darbepoetin alfa =

Pharmaceutical drug

Clinical data
- Trade names: Aranesp
- AHFS/Drugs.com: Monograph
- MedlinePlus: a604022
- License data: US DailyMed: Darbepoetin alfa
- Pregnancy category: AU: B3
- Routes of administration: Intravenous, subcutaneous
- ATC code: B03XA02 (WHO)

Legal status
- Legal status: AU: S4 (Prescription only); US: ℞-only; EU: Rx-only; In general: ℞ (Prescription only)

Identifiers
- CAS Number: 209810-58-2
- DrugBank: DB00012
- ChemSpider: none
- UNII: 15UQ94PT4P
- CompTox Dashboard (EPA): DTXSID7039678

Chemical and physical data
- Formula: C_{815}H_{1317}N_{233}O_{241}S_{5}
- Molar mass: 18396.19 g·mol^{−1}

Darbepoetin alfa (INN) /dɑːrbəˈpoʊɪtɪn/ is a re-engineered form of erythropoietin containing 5 amino acid changes (N30, T32, V87, N88, T90) resulting in the creation of 2 new sites for N-linked carbohydrate addition. It has a 3-fold longer serum half-life compared to epoetin alpha and epoetin beta. It stimulates erythropoiesis (increases red blood cell levels) by the same mechanism as rHuEpo (binding and activating the Epo receptor) and is used to treat anemia, commonly associated with chronic kidney failure and cancer chemotherapy. Darbepoetin is marketed by Amgen under the trade name Aranesp.

The medication was approved in September 2001, by the US Food and Drug Administration for treatment of anemia in patients with chronic kidney failure by intravenous or subcutaneous injection. In June 2001, it had been approved by the European Medicines Agency for this indication as well as the treatment of anemia in cancer patients undergoing chemotherapy.

Dr. Reddy's Laboratories launched darbepoetin alfa in India under the brand name Cresp in August 2010. This is the world's first follow-on biologic of darbepoetin alfa.

Darbepoetin is produced by recombinant DNA technology in modified Chinese hamster ovary cells. It differs from endogenous erythropoietin (EPO) by containing two more N-linked oligosaccharide chains. It is an erythropoiesis-stimulating 165-amino acid protein.

It is on the World Health Organization's List of Essential Medicines.

== Contraindications ==
Use of darbepoetin alfa is contraindicated in patients with hypersensitivity to the drug, pre-existing uncontrolled hypertension, and pure red cell aplasia.

== Adverse effects ==
Darbepoetin alfa has black box warnings in the United States for increased risk of death, myocardial infarction, stroke, venous thromboembolism, thrombosis of vascular access, and tumor progression or recurrence. To avoid side effects, it is recommended for patients with chronic kidney failure or cancer to use the lowest possible dose needed to avoid red blood cell (RBC) transfusions.

In addition to those listed in the black box warning, use of darbepoetin alfa also increases the risk of cardiovascular problems, including cardiac arrest, arrhythmia, hypertension and congestive heart failure, and edema. A recent study has extended these findings to treatment of patients exhibiting cancer-related anemia (distinct from anemia resulting from chemotherapy). Other reported adverse reactions include increased risk of seizure, hypotension, and chest pain.

== Pregnancy and lactation ==
Darbepoetin alfa is not assigned a pregnancy category in the United States.

It is not known if darbepoetin alfa is excreted in breast milk.

== Mechanism of action ==
Darbepoetin alfa binds to the erythropoietin receptor on erythroid progenitor cells, stimulating RBC production and differentiation.

== Safety advisories in anemic cancer patients ==
Amgen sent a "dear stockholders" letter in January 2007, that highlighted results from a recent anemia of cancer trial, and warned doctors to consider use in that off-label indication with caution.

Amgen advised the U.S. Food and Drug Administration (FDA) as to the results of the DAHANCA 10 clinical trial. The DAHANCA 10 data monitoring committee found that 3-year loco-regional control in subjects treated with Aranesp was significantly worse than for those not receiving Aranesp (p=0.01).

In response to these advisories, the FDA released a Public Health Advisory on 9 March 2007, and a clinical alert for doctors on 16 February 2007, about the use of erythropoeisis-stimulating agents (ESAs) such as epoetin alfa (marketed as Epogen) and darbepoetin alfa. The advisory recommended caution in using these agents in cancer patients receiving chemotherapy or off chemotherapy, and indicated a lack of clinical evidence to support improvements in quality of life or transfusion requirements in these settings.

According to the 2010 update to clinical practice guidelines from the American Society of Clinical Oncology (ASCO) and the American Society of Hematology (ASH), use of ESAs such as darbepoetin alfa in cancer patients is appropriate when following stipulations outlined in FDA-approved labeling.

== Society and culture ==
Like EPO, darbepoetin alfa has the potential to be abused by athletes seeking a competitive advantage. Its use during the 2002 Winter Olympic Games to improve performance led to the disqualification of cross-country skiers Larisa Lazutina of Russia, Olga Danilova of Russia and Johann Mühlegg of Spain from their final races.

=== Economics ===
Epogen and Aranesp had more than $6 billion in combined sales in 2006. Procrit sales were about $3.2 billion in 2006.
