= Katal =

SI derived unit of catalytic activity

katal
- Unit system: SI
- Unit of: catalysis
- Symbol: kat
- In SI base units: mol/s

The katal (symbol: kat) is a unit of the International System of Units (SI) used for quantifying the catalytic activity of enzymes (that is, measuring the enzymatic activity level in enzyme catalysis) and other catalysts. One katal is the catalytic activity that will raise the rate of conversion by one mole per second in a specified assay system.

The unit "katal" is not attached to a specified measurement procedure or assay condition, but any given catalytic activity is: the value measured depends on experimental conditions that must be specified. Therefore, to define the quantity of a catalyst in katals, the catalysed rate of conversion (the rate of conversion in presence of the catalyst minus the rate of spontaneous conversion) of a defined chemical reaction is measured in moles per second. One katal of trypsin, for example, is that amount of trypsin which breaks one mole of peptide bonds in one second under the associated specified conditions.

== Definition ==
One katal refers to an amount of enzyme that gives a catalysed rate of conversion of one mole per second. Because this is such a large unit for most enzymatic reactions, the nanokatal (nkat) is used in practice.

$$\text{kat}=\frac{\text{mol}}{\text{s}}$$

The katal is not used to express the rate of a reaction; that is expressed in units of concentration per second, as moles per liter per second. Rather, the katal is used to express catalytic activity, which is a property of the catalyst.

== SI multiples ==
SI multiples of katal (kat)
Submultiples			Multiples		
Value	SI symbol	Name	Value	SI symbol	Name
10^{−1} kat	dkat	decikatal	10^{1} kat	dakat	decakatal
10^{−2} kat	ckat	centikatal	10^{2} kat	hkat	hectokatal
10^{−3} kat	mkat	millikatal	10^{3} kat	kkat	kilokatal
10^{−6} kat	μkat	microkatal	10^{6} kat	Mkat	megakatal
10^{−9} kat	nkat	nanokatal	10^{9} kat	Gkat	gigakatal
10^{−12} kat	pkat	picokatal	10^{12} kat	Tkat	terakatal
10^{−15} kat	fkat	femtokatal	10^{15} kat	Pkat	petakatal
10^{−18} kat	akat	attokatal	10^{18} kat	Ekat	exakatal
10^{−21} kat	zkat	zeptokatal	10^{21} kat	Zkat	zettakatal
10^{−24} kat	ykat	yoctokatal	10^{24} kat	Ykat	yottakatal
10^{−27} kat	rkat	rontokatal	10^{27} kat	Rkat	ronnakatal
10^{−30} kat	qkat	quectokatal	10^{30} kat	Qkat	quettakatal

== History ==
The General Conference on Weights and Measures and other international organizations recommend use of the katal. It replaces the non-SI enzyme unit of catalytic activity. The enzyme unit is still more commonly used than the katal, especially in biochemistry. The adoption of the katal has been slow.

== Origin ==
The name "katal" has been used for decades. The first proposal to make it an SI unit came in 1978, and it became an official SI unit in 1999. The name comes from the Ancient Greek κατάλυσις (katalysis), meaning "dissolution"; the word "catalysis" itself is a Latinized form of the Greek word.
