= Clotilde-Camille Deflandre =

French scientist

Clotilde-Camille Deflandre (November 21, 1871 – June 7, 1946) was a French scientist primarily known for her discovery with her mentor Paul Carnot of Hémopoïétine" (erythropoietin). She also pioneered work that led to the development of organ transplantation. She was the first woman in France to receive both a "docteur en médicine” (doctorate in medicine) and a docteur ès naturel sciences (doctorate in natural sciences).

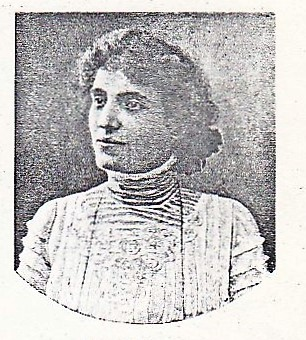
Photo of Clotilde-Camille Deflandre in 1910.

== Early life and education ==
Deflandre was born in the 7th arrondissement of Paris on November 21, 1871. Her father, Gustave Edouard Deflandre (1851-1909) was a railroad employee, a composer of religious music, and an organist at Dom Rue Simart 3 in Paris. Her mother, Marie Eugénie Giboz (1848-1938), was born in Autouillet, a commune in the Yvelines department of Northern France. She was working as a shop clerk at the time of her marriage to Deflandre in Paris on Sept 14, 1871. The Deflandres had three children, Jules Gustave (1870-1921), Clotilde and Georges Edouard (1876- ). Jules Gustave was the father of the paleogeologist Georges Deflandre (1897-1973).

== Career and research ==
In 1895, Mlle. Deflandre was working in the laboratory of Augustin Nicolas Gilbert at the hospital Broussais in Paris with Carnot. Her study, examining the ability of skin grafts from black guinea pigs to persist in white guinea pigs, had a profound effect on the modern field of organ transplantation and was cited byPeter Medawar winner of the 1960 Nobel Prize for his work on immunocompetence. Medawar referring to her paper stated that ”it has been known for fifty years that if black guinea pig skin is grafted to a white area on the same animal, a process that may non-committally be called infection takes place: the white skin that surrounds the black graft blackens centrifugally. Conversely, white skin grafted to a black area in due course blackens.” He formulated the hypothesis that differentiated cells in the adult organism “breed true and preserve forever in cellular inheritance their specificity of histological type", an important concept that led to the further development of tissue transplantation.

In 1903, Mlle. Deflandre received a docteur-ès-sciences from the University of Lille on “Fonction adipogénique du foie dans la série animale” (The adipogenic function of the liver in a series of animals) again with Carnot and Gilbert in Paris. She was only the fourth woman to receive a docteur-ès-sciences in France. The others included the astronomer Dorothea Klumpke, Mlle. Rodeau- Lozeau and the Nobel Prize winner, Marie Curie. Deflandre's work grew out of the interest of 19th century biologists, especially Claude Bernard, on the metabolic functions of the liver. She methodically studied adipo -hepatic function in a series of invertebrates and vertebrates. She also examined the ability of a fatty liver to repair damage from drugs such as cocaine

After working as a school teacher at the Collège de Jeunes Filles in Rouen, Mlle. Deflandre resumed her studies for her docteur en médicine. Carnot and Gilbert had a long-standing interest in opotherapy— the use of an organ extract to replace a missing humoral factor. Carnot's quest for a hematopoietic stimulating substance found in blood was firmly in this tradition. Working again with Carnot in Gilbert's laboratory, Deflandre set out to determine the factors that control red blood cell production for her thesis work. Carnot and Deflandre showed that injecting a small amount of the serum of a rabbit that had been previously bled resulted in an considerable increase in red blood cells the day after injection in normal recipient rabbits. They also showed that while the serum from an animal that had been bled was active, that of a normal animal was not. They found that the serum, rather than the formed elements of the blood, was responsible for the activity. Repeated bleeding resulted in an increase in serum activity. They named this substance hémopoïétine and postulated that it was a member of a group of cytopoïetines, now referred to as cytokines. Between 1906 and 1907, two articles by Carnot and Deflandre appeared in the “Comptes Rendus de L’Académie des Science”: describing the existence of a blood borne factor that could stimulate red blood cell production and the possible clinical application of this serum. These articles laid the intellectual foundation for the entire field of growth factors—that is proteins that are produced at one site and act on a distant target cell population. The first report received attention in both the scientific community and in the press. Deflandre ’s thesis for her docteur en médicine "Les Applications du Sérum Hémopoïétique" (The applications of hematopoietic serum) was approved by the Pharmacy Faculty of the University of Lille in 1910. The failure to reproduce her findings led to the loss of interest in this work. However, in 1947 Eva Bonsdorff and colleagues were able to reproduce the initial findings of Carnot and Deflandre and renamed the active substance erythropoietin. World-wide sales of recombinant erythropoietin were around $7 billion in 2012

Late in her career and after her marriage to Dr. Léon Dufour, Deflandre began a collaboration with Gaston Roussel (1877-1947) at the Roussel-Uclaf laboratories, one of the forerunner companies of Sanofi. Roussel had trained as a veterinarian and received a doctorate in medicine at the University of Paris. While there, he became acquainted with the work of Carnot and Deflandre, repeated their initial experiments and then used horses to scale up production of hémopoïtine for commercial use. His first product, Hemostyl, was widely used until the 1950s for treatment of anemia. Gaston and Deflandre (as Dufour-Deflandre) published a series of studies on the mineral content of embryonic materials as part of the continuing work of the Roussel laboratories to isolate active agents from organs for clinical use, again guided by the principles of opotherapy. Roussel Laboratories was among the first to produce steroid hormones for medical use.

== Personal life ==
Deflandre married Dr. Léon Adolphe Dufour on the 8th of November in 1921 in the 18th arrondissement in Paris. Dufour was a pioneer in infant nutrition working primarily in Fécamp in Normandy. He was the founder of the “Goutte de lait” (Drop of milk), an organization that devised safer methods of infant feeding to reduce childhood mortality Dufour died on May 23, 1928. Deflandre was also the aunt of Georges Deflandre (1897-1973), a noted paleo geologist. Mme. Dufour-Deflandre died at 74 on June 7, 1946 in Paris. She was buried in Eglise St. Etienne in Fécamp on June 13, 1946.
