= CFU-E =

Progenitor cell to a red blood cell

The term CFU-E (colony forming unit-erythroid) denotes a hematopoietic stem cell in the bone marrow which eventually matures into a red blood cell (also called an erythroid cell). It arises from CFU-GEMM (via BFU-E, which stands for "erythroid burst-forming units") and gives rise to proerythroblasts.

Mouse CFU-E colonies stained on Day 3 with Diaminobenzidine for hemoglobin

== Murine CFU-E assay ==
CFU-E is a stage of erythroid development between the BFU-E stage and the pro-erythroblast stage. CFU-E colony assay is designed to detect how many colony-forming-units of erythroid lineage there are in a hematopoietic tissue (bone marrow, spleen, or fetal liver), which may be reflective of the organism’s demand for oxygen delivery to the tissues or a hematopoietic disorder.

Early erythroid progenitors are found at a quite low frequency relative to later stages of erythroid differentiation, such as the pro-erythroblast and the basophilic erythroblast stages which can be detected by flowcytometry directly ex-vivo. Furthermore, unlike for the pro-erythroblast and later stages of erythroid development, no truly reliable and unique positive flow-cytometric markers exist, though it is possible to use negative exclusion markers to deplete a cell population of other precursors and differentiated cells by cell sorting, thus greatly enriching it for the CFU-E activity. CFU-E cells express Epo receptor, c-Kit (Stem cell factor receptor), transferrin receptor (CD71+), and are Ter119(glycophorin-A associated antigen)-negative. For the above reasons, the CFU-E assay, as inefficient and variable as it can often be, is still in use today.

Cells at the CFU-E stage express some erythropoietin receptor (EpoR), and thus can be induced to terminally differentiate in vitro in 2–3 days in the presence of only erythropoietin (Epo) (together with the basic contents of culture media: FBS, BSA in IMDM). Methylcellulose is a semisolid media additive that allows an investigator to stain (with diaminobenzidine reagent for hemoglobin) and then count individual colonies, each arising from a single plated progenitor that is at the CFU-E stage. By day 2 from the time of plating, each CFU-E colony will contain between 8 (minimum) and 64 hemoglobinized cells most of which are in their end-stage of erythroid differentiation. It is possible to see a small spectrum of hemoglobinization level and possibly cell size, indicating that some cells in the colony have achieved the end-stage faster than others.

Cell number in a colony is important because pro-erythroblast stage is also Epo-responsive (expresses Epo receptor), but the proliferative capacity of these cells is not as high, thus yielding a colony with fewer than 8 cells. Likewise, an earlier stage of erythroid differentiation may also yield colonies in Epo-only medium, but these colonies would likely be smaller and/or not hemoglobinized, since the stages before the CFU-E stage (MEP and BFU-E) require other factors (IL-3 etc) and more time for growth that will also delay the terminal differentiation and hemoglobinization.
