= Blood Feud (Sharp book) =

2011 book by Kathleen Sharp

Blood Feud: The man who blew the whistle on one of the deadliest prescription drugs ever
- Author: Kathleen Sharp
- Language: English
- Subject: Ethics; Medical
- Genre: True crime
- Publisher: Dutton
- Publication date: 20 September 2011
- Publication place: United States
- Media type: Print (Hardcover)
- Pages: 432
- ISBN: 978-0-525-95240-4

Blood Feud: The man who blew the whistle on one of the deadliest prescription drugs ever (2011) is a non-fiction book by American author Kathleen Sharp delves into the lives of Mark Duxbury and Dean McClellan, two drug salesmen for a unit of Johnson and Johnson. The friends sold record levels of J&J's anti-anemia drug Epoetin alfa, until they realized they were being asked to promote it in a fraudulent, off-label manner.

Duxbury and McClellan filed a lawsuit revealing how the pharmaceutical giant defrauded the public, flouted government regulations and ignored patient safety in its ruthless race to boost profit. Duxbury's and McClellan's whistle-blowing case is still in U.S. District court, being fought by attorney Jan Schlichtmann, famous for his efforts in a case described in another acclaimed book, A Civil Action. The last major ruling in the Duxbury case was in August 2009.

The book was also released in paperback with the revised title, Blood Medicine

== Reception ==
Sharp's book has been well-received as a significant work with Kirkus Reviews calling it, "a blockbuster of a story, especially today with Medicare potentially on the chopping block." Professionals from the medical industry at the Center for Medical Consumers also found the material factually relevant. They praise the informative nature of the book as it reveals the practices of the healthcare industry; "this book is a goldmine of information about how the nation's pharmaceutical companies inflate the cost of medicines while hiding the true cost from consumers as well as the government payers."

Yet, while portraying the subtleties of the pharmaceutical industry, the book can be picked up by anyone, as noted by Phyllis Hanlon of the NY Journal of Books, "Kathleen Sharp's writing style leads the reader effortlessly through this horrifying saga of deceit, greed, and human destruction. ... reads like a Robin Cook medical thriller and should be on every American's bookshelf."
