= Kathleen Sharp =

American author and journalist

Kathleen Sharp is an American author and award-winning journalist. A frequent contributor to the New York Times, Sharp has written for Vanity Fair, Parade, Playboy, Elle, Vogue, Fortune and others. She is from California, and much of the subject matter of her work is set in the West.

Sharp is the author of several books including Blood Feud: The Man Who Blew the Whistle on One of the Deadliest Prescription Drugs Ever (Dutton, 2011). The book, also known as Blood Medicine follows two salesmen as they race to blow the whistle on Epoetin alfa, a biotech blood drug sold by Johnson & Johnson and manufactured by Amgen. Oprah selected the book as a Top Ten Pick. New Regency has since purchased the film rights with Adam Cooper and Bill Collage (two of the co-authors of Tower Heist) writing the script. The whistle-blowing case remains mired in U.S. District Court in Boston.

Sharp also wrote Mr. & Mrs. Hollywood: Edie and Lew Wasserman and Their Entertainment Empire (Carroll & Graf, 2004). The dual biography became the basis of a film documentary, The Last Mogul, directed by Barry Avrich and released in theatres in 2005. Sharp worked as a consulting producer on the film, which featured interviews and clips of some of her 400 sources, including Presidents Jimmy Carter and Ronald Reagan.

Sharp was the last person to interview the actress Fay Wray, which she did for a Playboy magazine feature about the Peter Jackson remake of King Kong. That feature became the book Stalking the Beast: How Hollywood Supersized King Kong (Jacaranda Books).

Sharp has written shorter pieces that have appeared in several anthologies, including Thrillers: 100 Must Reads (Oceanview Publishing), a collection of essays written by members of International Thriller Writers (IFC). Sharp is on the membership committee and heads the non-fiction branch of IFC.

== Journalism ==
Sharp worked for several years as a special correspondent for The Los Angeles Times, covering Central California. Later, she became the Hollywood correspondent for the Boston Globe. She has won several awards for her investigative reporting and feature writing, including six from the Society of Professional Journalists; a scholarship to study at the Graduate School of Business at the University of Washington; and a fellowship to attend the University of Southern California’s Annenberg School for Communication and Journalism.

== Film, television and radio ==
Sharp has appeared in news segments about her work for TV5 World; France 2, the largest French TV news network; and several U.S. television shows including ABC News. She's been interviewed for numerous film documentaries broadcast by Bravo, A&E and The Biography Channel. She was a consultant for Moguls and Movie Stars: A History of Hollywood, a seven-part series produced by Turner Classic Movies (TCM) and Bill Haber's Ostar Productions that debuted in 2011.

From the American West, Sharp has contributed stories to National Public Radio's All Things Considered and Morning Edition. She's been a guest on dozens of national and regional radio shows discussing health care reform and America's medical problems.

== Bibliography ==
Blood Feud: The Man Who Blew the Whistle on One of the Deadliest Prescription Drugs Ever (Dutton, 2011) ISBN 978-0-525-95240-4
Stalking the Beast: How Hollywood Supersized King Kong (Jacaranda Books, 2006) ISBN 978-1-4116-7385-4
Mr. & Mrs. Hollywood: Edie and Lew Wasserman and Their Entertainment Empire (Carroll & Graf, 2004)
In Good Faith: The Inside Story of Prudential-Bache’s Multibillion-Dollar Scandal (St. Martin's Press, 1996)

=== Anthology appearances ===
Thrillers: 100 Must Reads (Oceanview Publishing, 2009)
Experiencing Race, Class & Gender (McGraw Hill, 1993, 1997, 2000, 2005, 2009)
Sports in America (Greenhaven Press, 1994)
