= Oculogyric crisis =

- Specialty: Neurology

Oculogyric crisis (OGC) is a rare sudden, paroxysmal, dystonic reaction that may manifest in response to specific drugs, particularly neuroleptics, or medical conditions, such as movement disorders. This neurological phenomenon is characterized by a sustained dystonic, conjugate, involuntary upward deviation of both eyes lasting seconds to hours. The term oculogyric is applied in reference to the simultaneous upward movement of both eyes, although the reaction may encompass a variety of additional responses. The reaction is not life-threatening.

For clarification, oculogyric seizures, also termed versive seizures, represent one of the manifestations of epilepsy. These seizures exhibit the same upward eye movement observed in OGC but are classified as a specific subtype of epilepsy.

== Signs and symptoms ==
Initial symptoms include restlessness, agitation, malaise, or a fixed stare. Then comes the more characteristically described extreme and sustained upward deviation of the eyes. In addition, the eyes may converge, deviate upward and laterally, or deviate downward. The most frequently reported associated findings are backwards and lateral flexion of the neck, widely opened mouth, tongue protrusion, and ocular pain. However, the condition may also be associated with intensely painful jaw spasms which may result in the breaking of a tooth. A wave of exhaustion may follow an episode. The abrupt termination of the psychiatric symptoms at the conclusion of the crisis is most striking.

Other features that are noted during attacks include mutism, palilalia, eye blinking, lacrimation, pupil dilation, drooling, respiratory dyskinesia, increased blood pressure and heart rate, facial flushing, headache, vertigo, anxiety, agitation, compulsive thinking, paranoia, depression, recurrent fixed ideas, depersonalization, violence, and obscene language.

In addition to the acute presentation, oculogyric crisis can develop as a recurrent syndrome, triggered by stress and by exposure to the drugs mentioned below.

== Causes ==
Drugs that can trigger an oculogyric crisis include neuroleptics (such as haloperidol, chlorpromazine, fluphenazine, olanzapine), carbamazepine, chloroquine, cisplatin, diazoxide, levodopa, lithium, metoclopramide, lurasidone, domperidone, nifedipine, pemoline, phencyclidine ("PCP"), reserpine, and cetirizine, an antihistamine. High-potency neuroleptics are the most common cause.

Other causes can include aromatic L-amino acid decarboxylase deficiency, postencephalitic Parkinson's, Tourette's syndrome, multiple sclerosis, neurosyphilis, head trauma, bilateral thalamic infarction, lesions of the fourth ventricle, cystic glioma of the third ventricle, herpes encephalitis, kernicterus and juvenile Parkinson's disease.

Drug class	Drug implicated
First-generation typical antipsychotics	Haloperidol, chlorpromazine, flupenthixol, zuclopenthixol, fluphenazine
Second-generation atypical antipsychotics	Risperidone, amisulpiride, aripiprazole, olanzapine, quetiapine, clozapine, lurasidone, cariprazine
Antidepressants	Escitalopram, imipramine, fluvoxamine
Anticonvulsants	Carbamazepine, lamotrigine, gabapentin
"Other"	Chloroquine, cisplatin, diazoxide, levodopa, domperidone, cetirizine, phencyclidine, nifedipine, pemoline

== Diagnosis ==
The diagnosis of oculogyric crisis is largely clinical and involves taking a focused history and physical examination to identify possible triggers for the crisis and rule out other causes of abnormal ocular movements.

== Treatment ==
Immediate treatment of drug-induced OGC can be achieved with intravenous antimuscarinics, such as benzatropine or procyclidine. Any causative new medication should be discontinued. The condition may also be treated with the antihistamine diphenhydramine.
