= Polioencephalitis =

- Specialty: Neurology/infectious disease

Polioencephalitis is a viral infection of the brain, causing inflammation within the grey matter of the brain stem. The virus has an affinity for neuronal cell bodies, and has been found to affect mostly the midbrain, pons, medulla and cerebellum of most infected patients. The infection can reach up through the thalamus and hypothalamus and possibly reach the cerebral hemispheres. The infection is caused by the poliomyelitis virus which is a single-stranded, positive sense RNA virus surrounded by a non-enveloped capsid. Humans are the only known natural hosts of this virus. The disease has been eliminated from the U.S. since the mid-twentieth century, but is still found in certain areas of the world, such as Africa.

== Signs and symptoms ==
Signs and symptoms may vary and some individuals may not experience any symptoms at all. The most common reported symptom of polioencephalitis is fatigue. Fatigue is associated with difficulty in attention, cognition, and maintaining wakefulness Some individuals experience psychiatric symptoms that include anxious mood, pain, insomnia, and depressed mood. Confusion and disorientation of time and space have also been reported. Motor symptoms vary more from patient to patient, but can include incoordination and tremors, nystagmus, loss of conjugate eye movements, rigidity and hemiparesis.

== Mechanism ==
The poliomyelitis virus is an enterovirus that enters through the mouth and multiplies in the throat and epithelial cells of the gastrointestinal tract. It will then move to the bloodstream and is carried to the central nervous system. Once in the CNS, the virus will attach to a host cell by binding with a cell surface receptor. The host cell surface receptor is a glycoprotein that has been recently identified as CD155. Once the virus has bound to the host cell, it will penetrate the host cell membrane and begin the replication of its genome. Many cells contain the surface receptor CD155; however, manifestation of this disease does not occur in all cells. The reason for incidence of the disease in only certain areas of the brain such as the brainstem is unknown. Once areas of the brain have been invaded by the virus, inflammation will occur. During inflammation, the brain’s tissues become swollen due to the body’s immune system response to the infection. Fluid, white blood cells, dead cellular debris and inactivated viruses resulting from the actions of the immune response can significantly alter the fluid surrounding healthy neurons. The function of these healthy neurons can decline due to disruptions in the cell membrane affecting electrical properties of the neuron or by interfering with the blood supply causing anoxic cellular damage. Depending on which neurons are damaged will result in a variety of different symptoms.

== Diagnosis ==
If someone is suspected of having polioencephalitis a sample of throat secretions, stool or cerebrospinal fluid is checked for the virus. Blood tests can be done to detect antibodies against viral antigens and foreign proteins. Virus isolation is the most sensitive method and it is most likely to be isolated from stool samples. Once isolated, RT-PCR is used to differentiate naturally occurring strains from vaccine-like strains.

== Prevention ==
The virus is most often spread by person to person contact with the stool or saliva of the infected person. Two types of vaccines have been developed to prevent the occurrence and spread of the poliomyelitis virus. The first is an inactivated, or killed, form of the virus and the second is an attenuated, or weakened, form of the virus. The development of vaccines has successfully eliminated the disease from the United States. There are continued vaccination efforts in the U.S. to maintain this success rate as this disease still occurs in some areas of the world.

== Treatment ==
There is no cure for polioencephalitis so prevention is essential. Many people that become infected will not develop symptoms and their prognosis is excellent. However, the prognosis is dependent on the amount of cellular damage done by the virus and the area of the brain affected. Many people that develop more severe symptoms can have lifelong disabilities or it can lead to death. Supportive treatments include bed rest, pain relievers, and a nutritious diet. Many drugs have been used to treat psychiatric symptoms such as Clonazepam for insomnia and Desvenlafaxine or Citalopram for depressed mood.

== Recent research ==
Research into the mechanism of this disease stalled with the development of the vaccines in the mid-twentieth century. However, with the recent identification of the cell surface receptor CD155 new interest has resurfaced in this disease. Experiments on transgenic mice are investigating the initial sites of viral replication in the host and how the virus moves from the bloodstream into the central nervous system. Research into the host range of the virus has also been of interest. The host range of a virus is determined by the interaction of the virus with host cellular receptors such as CD155. Comparison of the amino acid sequence in the binding domain of the host cell receptor is highly variable among mammalian species. Rapid changes in the sequence of the binding domain have restricted the host range of the poliovirus. Targeting of the brain and spinal cord have also come under investigation. The restricted tropism maybe due to organ specific differences in the initiation of translation by the virus internal ribosome entry site.
