= Molly Caldwell Crosby =

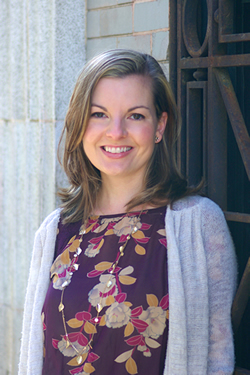
- Born: Molly Caldwell; August 22, 1972 (age 54); Dallas, Texas, U.S.
- Occupation: Author
- Website: www.mollycrosby.com

Molly Caldwell Crosby (born August 22, 1972) is a journalist and author of three literary nonfiction books: The American Plague, Asleep, and The Great Pearl Heist.

Crosby received her BA from Rhodes College in Memphis, Tennessee, and her MFA from Johns Hopkins University’s Zanvyl Krieger School of Arts and Sciences. She has worked for National Geographic magazine, as well as a freelance journalist. She lives in Memphis with her husband, Andrew Crosby, and their two daughters.

== Works ==
The American Plague: The Untold Story of Yellow Fever, the Epidemic that Shaped Our History (Berkley Books, Penguin, USA, 2006) is a national bestseller and was called a "first-rate medical detective drama" by the New York Times Sunday Book Review and "gripping" by Newsweek. It was chosen as a New York Times editor's pick and a Book Sense pick. The book is the narrative account of a disease that once ravaged cities like New York, Philadelphia, and New Orleans culminating in the devastating 1878 yellow fever epidemic in Memphis, Tennessee—the worst urban disaster of its time. The book also chronicles the controversial human experimentation conducted by Walter Reed and his team of army physicians in Cuba in 1900, which eventually led to the conquering of the disease known as "the American Plague.”

Asleep: The Forgotten Epidemic that Remains One of Medicine’s Greatest Mysteries (Berkley Books, Penguin, USA, 2010). Dr. Oliver Sacks, author of Awakenings, called the book a “brilliant and deeply moving account.” It was chosen as an April 2010 pick for Scientific American magazine and a May 2010 pick for Discover magazine. Also a narrative nonfiction account, it tells the story of the mysterious 1920s epidemic of encephalitis lethargica or Von Economo's encephalitis, popularly known as sleepy sickness (different from sleeping sickness). The pandemic affected as many as 5 million people and remains a mystery today, but current research is focusing on its connection to the 1918 influenza pandemic or its role as an immune response to strep throat. Crosby's own grandmother was a survivor of the epidemic in Dallas, Texas.

The Great Pearl Heist: London’s Greatest Thief and Scotland Yard’s Hunt for the World’s Most Valuable Necklace (Berkley Books, Penguin, USA, 2012) tells the true story of a strand of pearls—worth twice the amount of the Hope Diamond—that disappeared in transit between Paris and Hatton Garden, London, in 1913. Set against the backdrop of Edwardian London, the book follows the psychological cat and mouse game between a Scotland Yard detective and the wily gentleman thief responsible for the heist. The book was chosen as an Indie Next List pick for December 2012, a Barnes and Noble Best Book of the Month pick, Booklist gave it a starred review, and Publishers Weekly described it as a "winning true crime tale." Candice Millard, author of River of Doubt and Destiny of the Republic, called it, "the thrilling story of a seemingly impossible theft…Crosby has written a book that is as enchanting and irresistible as its subject." And Jeffrey Jackson, author of Paris Under Water, said, "Crosby tells a fascinating story rooted in such deep historical research that we can practically watch the drama unfold in real time…as the clouds of war gathered across the continent, the struggle between thieves and the legal system symbolized the larger strains of holding European society together at the beginning of the twentieth century.”

== Awards and Appearances ==
Crosby was nominated for the Barnes and Noble Discover Great New Writers Award, Borders Original Voices Award, and the Southern Independent Booksellers Award in 2006. In 2008, she received the Cynthia Pitcock History Award from St. Mary's School in Memphis, and in 2011, she was given the Germantown Arts Alliance medal for literary arts. She has served as a visiting professor in the Master of Arts program at the University of Memphis and has appeared on C-SPAN Book TV, PBS, The Diane Rehm Show, NPR's Morning Edition, John Seigenthaler's A Word on Words, and Bloomberg radio, as well as giving book talks at the U.S. Department of Interior, St. Jude Children's Research Hospital, the University of Tennessee Medical School, the University of Memphis, and Teach for America.
