= Enzyme unit =

Unit of catalytic activity

The enzyme unit or international unit (symbol U or IU) is a unit measuring an enzyme's catalytic activity. An enzyme unit is defined as the amount of the enzyme that catalyzes the conversion of one micromole (μmol) of substrate per minute (min) under the specified conditions of the assay method. The specified conditions will usually be the optimal conditions—including but not limited to temperature, pH, and substrate concentration—which yield the maximal substrate conversion rate for that particular enzyme. In some assay methods, one usually takes a temperature of 25°C.

The enzyme unit was adopted by the International Union of Biochemistry in 1964. However, since the minute is not an SI base unit of time, the enzyme unit is discouraged in favor of the katal (kat), which corresponds to the amount of enzyme that catalyzes one mole of substrate per second, instead. Thus 1 U = 16.67 nanokatal. While the katal was recommended by the 1978 General Conference on Weights and Measures and officially adopted in 1999, almost all scientific research still uses the enzyme unit, for the simple reason that enzyme assays usually last for minutes, not seconds.

The enzyme unit is sometimes also called the international unit, causing confusion with the identically named international unit of biological activity. The latter is used to measure biopharmaceuticals, like vitamins and hormones, and is defined by an arbitrary standard of biological activity set for each particular substance. Thus, there is no relation between the two units, despite their identical names; for example, an IU of the enzyme catalase has no meaningful relation to an IU of vitamin C.

== See also ==
- Turnover number
- Enzyme assay
- Enzyme catalysis
