= Paul Carnot =

French physician

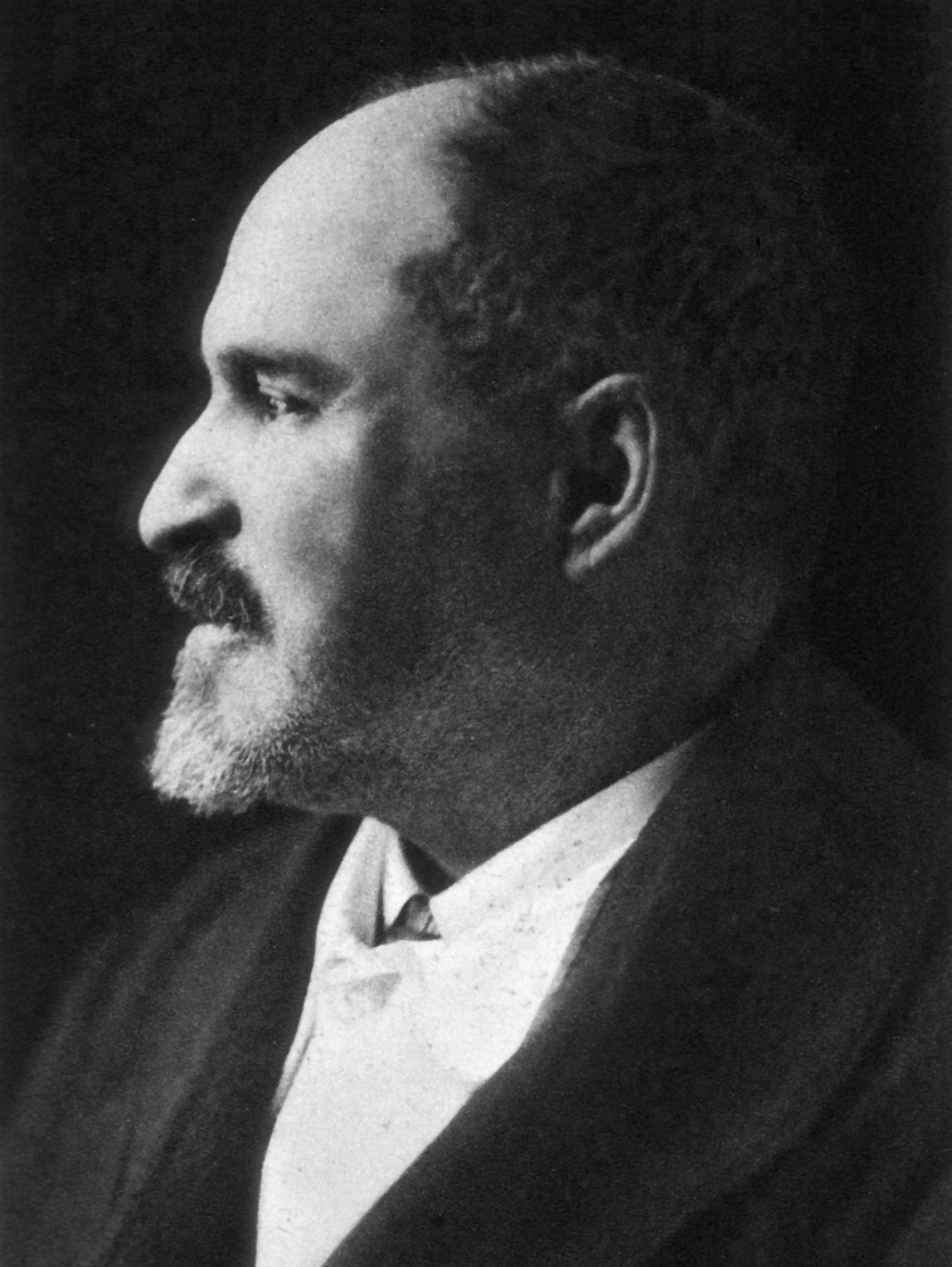
Paul Carnot

Paul Carnot (English: /kɑːrˈnoʊ/ kar-NOH, French: [pɔl kaʁno]; 16 January 1869, in Limoges – 1 April 1957, in Paris) was a French physician.

He served as médecin des hôpitaux in Paris, becoming a professor of therapeutic medicine in 1918 to the Paris medical faculty. In 1922 he was elected as a member to the Académie de Médecine.

== Career ==
In 1906 he coined the term hémopoïétine (hemopoietin) to define a humoral factor he believed was responsible for regulation of red blood cell production. This being based on experiments with laboratory rabbits that he conducted with his graduate student Clotilde-Camille DeFlandre. They noticed that an increase of reticulocytes in normal rabbits occurred following the injection of blood plasma taken from anemic donor rabbits who had earlier been subject to bloodletting. Findings from their research were published in a paper titled Sur l'activité hémopoïétique du sérum au cours de la régénération du sang (On the hemopoietic activity of serum during the regeneration of blood).

Carnot was the author of numerous treatises on a wide array of medical subjects. With Paul Brouardel (1837–1906), Augustin Nicolas Gilbert (1858–1927) and others, he published the multi-volume Nouveau traité de médecine et de thérapeutique. The following are a few of his better known writings:

- Recherches sur le Mécanisme de la Pigmentation, 1896 (medical doctoral thesis)
- Les régénerations d'organes, 1899 (Regeneration of organs)
- Maladies microbiennes en général, 1905 (Microbial illnesses in general)
- Médications histopoiétiques et médications histolytiques, 1911 (Medications histopoietic and histolytic)
- Precis de therapeutique, 1925 (Summary of therapy)
- La clinique medicale de l'Hôtel-Dieu et l'oeuvre du Pr Gilbert 1927 (The Medical Clinic of the Hôtel-Dieu and the work of Professor Gilbert)

His great-grand-father was Lazare Carnot, a French general, his father, Marie Adolphe Carnot was an engineer, head of the French École des Mines de Paris.
