= DAHANCA =

Danish cancer treatment working group

The Danish Head and Neck Cancer (DAHANCA) group was established in 1976 as a working group by the Danish Society for Head and Neck Oncology with the primary aim to develop national guidelines for the treatment of head and neck cancer in Denmark.

The DAHANCA group's activities have included creating and running a national quality database, development of treatment guidelines, performing numerous national clinical protocol studies ( more than 38), and providing quality assurance programs. The group is multidisciplinary and consists of representatives from all the oncology centers in Denmark (and some in Norway) treating head and neck cancer, including oncologists, otolaryngologists, pathologists, imaging diagnosticians, experimental researchers, epidemiologists, and other expert support, e.g., medical physicists.

The DAHANCA model was behind the establishment of the structure of the Danish Multidisciplinary Cancer Groups (DMCG), and the DAHANCA group is thus the oldest of the still active DMCG.

The DAHANCA webpage with available information about current guidelines, protocols, clinical trials, annual reports and organisation can be found at www.DAHANCA.dk.

== List of clinical trials ==
=== DAHANCA – Completed studies ===
DAHANCA 1 (1976–79, 153 pts) - BMV-induction chemotherapy and irradiation in St. 3-4 larynx and pharynx (phase 2)

DAHANCA 2 (1979–85, 626 pts) - Randomized study of Misonidazole as hypoxic radiosensitizer in larynx and pharynx

DAHANCA 3 (1979–87, 85 pts) - Predictive value of EBV titre in NPC.

DAHANCA 4 (1988–90, 35 pts) - Randomized study of induction chemotherapy (5-FU, cisDDP) in oral cavity (part of Scandinavian trial, 461 pts)

DAHANCA 5, 1986–90, 422 pts) - Randomized study of Nimorazole as hypoxic sensitizer.

DAHANCA 6 (1992–99, 694 pts) - Randomized study of 5 vs 6 fx / week in glottic larynx

DAHANCA 7 (1992–96, 791 pts) - Randomized study of 5 vs 6 fx / week (plus Nimorazole) in supraglottic, oral cavity and pharynx.

DAHANCA 8 (1998-2003, 70 pts) - Vineralbine and 5-FU in advanced head and neck cancer (phase 2).

DAHANCA 9 (2000–06, 71 pts) - Randomized study of hyperfractionated accelerated vs accelerated radiotherapy in node-negative head and neck carcinoma.

DAHANCA 10 (2002-2006, 522 pts) - Randomized study of the role of EPO in low-Hb patients

DAHANCA 11 (2005 – never initiated) - Randomized study of treatment of unknown primary in the neck (Intergroup/EORTC). NCT00047125

DAHANCA 12 (1998-2001, 490 pts) – Retro/prospective evaluation of ipsilateral treatment of tonsillar carcinoma.

DAHANCA 13 (2002-2005, 125 pts) - Study of PET in diagnosis of Head and Neck Cancer

DAHANCA 14 (2003-2011, 102 pts) – Registration study of chemoradiotherapy in NPC

DAHANCA 15 (2003-2004, 28 pts) - Phase I-II study of Zalutumumab (anti-EGFr) as adjuvant to radiotherapy.

DAHANCA 16 (2006-2009, 22 pts) – Phase III randomized study of postop. elective vs. salvage surgery for N2-N3 neck nodes in patients given primary radiotherapy.

DAHANCA 17 (2007 – never activated) – POPART – postoperative radiotherapy (with Dutch HN-group)

DAHANCA 18 (2006-2010, 357 pts) - Registration study of chemoradiotherapy.

DAHANCA 19 (2007 –2012, 619 pts) - Randomized study of Zalutumumab (anti-EGFr) as adjuvant to radiotherapy. ClinicalTrials.gov Identifier: NCT00496652

DAHANCA 20 (2006 – 30 pts) – Phase II study of palliative radiotherapy. ClinicalTrials.gov Identifier: NCT00400426

DAHANCA 21 (2007 – 97 patients) – Behandling af mandibulær osteoradionekrose med hyperbar oxygen (HBO). Et klinisk randomiseret studie. ClinicalTrials.gov Identifier: NCT00760682

DAHANCA 22 (2007 – 30 pts) – Registration study of sentinel lymphnode (with EORTC 24021)

DAHANCA 23 (2009 – never activated) Estimation of tumor hypoxia using ^{18}F -FAZA Positron Emissions Tomografi in operable head and neck squamous cell carcinoma.

DAHANCA 24 (2009-2011, 40 pts) The prognostic value of ^{18}F -FAZA Positron Emissions Tomografi in patients with squanmous cell carcinoma after primary radiotherapy. ClinicalTrials.gov Identifier: NCT01017224

DAHANCA 25A (2009- 2011, 30 pts) Styrketræning kombineret med kosttilskud som intervention til genopbygning af muskelmasse efter strålebehandling for hoved-hals cancer. ClinicalTrials.gov Identifier: NCT01025518

DAHANCA 25B (2011- 2012, 40 pts) Progressive resistance training combined with nutritional supplements as intervention for re-building the muscle mass after primary radiotherapy of head and neck cancer. ClinicalTrials.gov Identifier: NCT01509430

DAHANCA 26 (2016 – 2020, 31 patients) Phase II Multicenter, unblinded, randomized study of paclitaxel and capecitabine versus paclitaxel, capecitabine and Cetuximab as first line treatment for recurrent and or metastatic head and neck squamous cell carcinoma.EudraCT 2014-001023-80

DAHANCA 28 (2013-2019, 50 patients ) Phase I/II study of accelerated hyperfractionate radiotherapy, concomitant cisplatin and nimorazol to patients with stage III-IV p16 negative squamous cell carcinoma of the larynx, pharynx and cavum oris. ClinicalTrials.gov Identifier: NCT01733823

DAHANCA 29 – EORTC 1219-ROG-HNCG (2014 -210 pts) A blind randomized multicenter study of accelerated fractionated chemo-radiotherapy with or without the hypoxic radiosensitizer nimorazole (Nimoral), using a 15 gene signature for hypoxia in the treatment of squamous cell carcinoma of the head and neck. ClinicalTrials.gov Identifier: NCT01880359

DAHANCA 32 (2014-2017, 26 pts) Electrochemotherapy of recurrent HNSCC. ClinicalTrials.gov Identifier: NCT02557529

=== DAHANCA – Ongoing or planned studies ===
DAHANCA 27 (2012 - 191 patients) – Transoral Laser Mikrokirurgi ved T1a glottis-cancer.

DAHANCA 30 (2016 – 724 patients) A randomized non-inferiority trial of hypoxia-profile guided hypoxic modification with nimorazole during radiotherapy/chemo-radiotherapy of squamous cell carcinoma of the head and neck. EudraCT 2014-001023-80. ClinicalTrials.gov Identifier: NCT02661152

DAHANCA 31 (2015 – 48 patients) Progressive resistance training during concomitant radiotherapy of HNSCC. ClinicalTrials.gov Identifier: NCT02557529

DAHANCA 33 (2017 – 40 patients) Functional Image Guided Dose-escalated Radiotherapy to Patients With Hypoxic Squamous Cell Carcinoma of the Head and Neck. ClinicalTrials.gov Identifier: NCT02976051

DAHANCA 34 (2019- 20 patients) Quality of Life After primary TORS vs IMRT "The QoLATI study” for patients with early-stage oropharyngeal squamous cell carcinoma: A Randomized National Trial. ClinicalTrials.gov Identifier: NCT04124198

DAHANCA 35 pilot: (2019- 42 pts) A national randomized trial of proton versus photon radiotherapy for the treatment of squamous cell carcinoma of the head and neck.

DAHANCA 35 RCT: (2020- ) A national randomized trial of proton versus photon radiotherapy for the treatment of squamous cell carcinoma of the head and neck.

DAHANCA 36A: (2019-) Morbidity after radiation therapy for sinonasal carcinoma.

DAHANCA 37: (2019- 2 pts) A phase II study of intensity modulated proton therapy (IMPT) for re-irradiation with curative intent for recurrent or new primary head and neck cancer. ClinicalTrials.gov identifier (NCT number): NCT03981068

DAHANCA 38: (2019- 129 pts) Management of side effects in head and neck cancer by systematic use of PRO during radiotherapy. The national DAHANCA PRO study
