= Post-encephalitic parkinsonism =

Medical condition

- Specialty: Neurology

Post-encephalitic parkinsonism is a disease believed to be caused by a viral illness that triggers degeneration of the nerve cells in the substantia nigra. Overall, this degeneration leads to clinical parkinsonism.

Historically, starting in 1917 an epidemic of encephalitis lethargica, also called von Economo's encephalitis or "sleepy-disease" occurred, possibly related to the 1918 Spanish flu pandemic; however, even with the use of modern molecular diagnostic tests on appropriate corpses, no firm link between encephalitis lethargica and influenza has been made. Although parkinsonism was occasionally seen during the acute encephalitic phase of encephalitis lethargica, it was often encountered in the post-encephalitic phase. The onset of post-encephalitic parkinsonism may occur several years after the resolution of encephalitis lethargica.

The brain regions affected contain neurofibrillary tangles, similar to those seen in Alzheimer's disease. In post-encephalitic parkinsonism patients, however, the senile plaques common in Alzheimer's disease are not found.
