= Self-disorder =

Mental state of a reduced perception of self-awareness

- Other names: Ipseity disturbance
- Specialty: Psychiatry
- Causes: Schizophrenia and other schizophrenia spectrum disorders

Self-disorder, also called ipseity disturbance (/ɪpˈsiɪti/ ip-SEE-ih-tee), is a psychological phenomenon of disruption or diminishing of a person's minimal self – the fundamental sense that one's experiences are truly one's own. People with self-disorder feel that their internal experiences are actually external; for example, they may experience their own thoughts as coming from outside themselves, whether in the form of true auditory hallucinations or merely as a vague sense that their thoughts do not belong to them.

There is evidence that self-disorder is characteristic of schizophrenia spectrum disorders such as schizophrenia itself as well as schizotypal personality disorder. This is true across both psychotic and non-psychotic disorders. The presence or absence of self-disorders has been used to distinguish schizophrenia spectrum disorders from other psychotic disorders, bipolar disorder, borderline personality disorder, and autism spectrum disorder. Detecting self-disorders may also be useful for early intervention in psychosis, since they occur in the prodrome of schizophrenia prior to the emergence of psychotic symptoms.

The concept resembles the basic symptoms of schizophrenia, but the term itself was introduced in the early 2000s together with the Examination of Anomalous Self-Experience (EASE) scale, which is used to measure the presence and severity of self-disorder. The concept is associated with the theoretical approach to psychology known as phenomenology.

== Minimal self ==
The minimal (or basic) self has been likened to a "flame that enlightens its surroundings and thereby itself." The sense of minimal self refers to the very basic sense of having experiences that are one's own; it has no properties, unlike the extended self, which is composed of properties such as the person's identity, the person's narrative, their likes and dislikes, and other aspects that are the result of reflection on one's self. The minimal self, however, refers to the "mine-ness" or "given-ness" of experience, that the experiences are that of the person having them in that person's stream of consciousness. These experiences that are part of the minimal self are normally "tacit" and implied, requiring no reflection on the part of the person experiencing to know that the experience is theirs. The minimal self cannot be further elaborated and normally one cannot grasp it upon reflection. The minimal self goes hand-in-hand with immersion in the shared social world, such that "[t]he world is always pregiven, ie, tacitly grasped as a self-evident background of all experiencing and meaning." This is the self-world structure.

De Warren gives an example of the minimal self combined with immersion in the shared social world: "When looking at this tree in my backyard, my consciousness is directed toward the tree and not toward my own act of perception. I am, however, aware of myself as perceiving this tree, yet this self-awareness (or self-consciousness) is not itself thematic." The focus is normally on the tree itself, not on the person's own act of seeing the tree: to know that one is seeing the tree does not require an act of reflection.

== Disturbance ==
In the schizophrenia spectrum disorders, the minimal self and the self-world structure are "constantly challenged, unstable, and oscillating," causing anomalous self-experiences known as self-disorders. These involve the person feeling as if they lack an identity, as if they are not really existing, that the sense of their experiences being their own (the "mine-ness" of their experiential world) is failing or diminishing, as if their inner experiences are no longer private, and that they don't really understand the world. These experiences lead to the person engaging in hyper-reflectivity, or abnormally prolonged and intense self-reflection, to attempt to gain a grasp on these experiences, but such intense reflection may further exacerbate the self-disorders. Self-disorders tend to be chronic, becoming incorporated into the person's way of being and affecting "how" they experience the world and not necessarily "what" they experience. This instability of the minimal self may provoke the onset of psychosis.

Similar phenomena can occur in other conditions, such as bipolar disorder and depersonalization derealization disorder, but Sass's (2014) review of the literature comparing accounts of self-experience in various mental disorders shows that serious self-other confusion and "severe erosion of minimal self-experience" only occur in schizophrenia; as an example of the latter, Sass cites the autobiographical account of Elyn Saks, who has schizophrenia, of her experience of "disorganization" in which she felt that thoughts, perceptions, sensations, and even the passage of time became incoherent, and that she had no longer "the solid center from which one experiences reality", which occurred when she was 7 or 8 years old. This disturbance tends to fluctuate over time based on emotions and motivation, accounting for the phenomenon of dialipsis in schizophrenia, where neurocognitive performance tends to be inconsistent over time.

The disturbance of the minimal self may manifest in people in various ways, including as a tendency to inspect one's thoughts in order to know what they are thinking, like a person seeing an image, reading a message, or listening closely to someone talking (audible thoughts; or in German: Gedankenlautwerden). In normal thought, the "signifier" (the images or inner speech representing the thought) and the "meaning" are combined into the "expression", so that the person "inhabits" their thinking, or that both the signifier and the meaning implicitly come to mind together; the person does not need to reflect on their thoughts to understand what they are thinking. In people with self-disorder, however, it is frequently the case that many thoughts are experienced as more like external objects that are not implicitly comprehended. The person must turn their focus toward the thoughts to understand their thoughts because of that lack of implicit comprehension, a split of the signifier and the meaning from each other, where the signifier emerges automatically in the field of awareness but the meaning does not. This is an example of the failing "mine-ness" of the experiential field as the minimal self recedes from its own thoughts, which are consigned to an outer space. This is present chronically, both during and outside of psychosis, and may represent a middle point between normal inner speech and auditory hallucinations, as well as normal experience and first-rank symptoms.

They may also experience uncontrolled multiple trains of thought with different themes simultaneously coursing through one's head interfering with concentration (thought pressure) or often feel they must attend to things with their full attention in order to get done what most people can do without giving it much thought (hyper-reflectivity), which can lead to fatigue.

== Examination of Anomalous Self-Experience (EASE) ==
The EASE is a semi-structured interview that attempts to capture the extent of the mainly non-psychotic self-disorders experienced by the person. It is divided into 5 broad sections:

1. Cognition and stream of consciousness, which covers disturbances in the flow of thoughts and experiences, and includes such self-disorders as "thought pressure", an experienced chaos of unrelated thoughts, "loss of thought ipseity", a sense as if the person does not own their thoughts (but not to the level of psychosis), and "spatialization of experience", which is where the person experiences their thoughts as if they occurred within a space.
2. Self-awareness and presence, which deals with dissociative experiences of the self and world as well as a tendency toward intense reflection, in addition to a declining understanding of how to interact with others and the world called "perplexity" or "lack of natural evidence."
3. Bodily experiences, which deals with alienating experiences of the body as well as with "mimetic experiences", the sense of a person that if they move, pseudo-movements of other, unrelated objects are experienced
4. Demarcation/transitivism, which covers specific disturbances in the person's ego boundaries such as the person confusing their own thoughts, ideas, and feelings for that of their interlocutor.
5. Existential reorientation, which refers to changes in the person's experience of the world that reflect the effect of self-disorders on the person's worldview.

A large number of these items have affinities with the basic symptoms.

The EASE, and pre-EASE studies attempting to assess basic self-disturbance, has been found in studies to discriminate between people on the schizophrenia spectrum, and those with psychotic bipolar disorder or borderline personality disorder. The EASE has been found to have good reliability, meaning that when 2 clinicians do the assessment, they draw roughly the same conclusions. The items on the EASE were compared against the accounted experiences of depersonalization disorder, finding many affinities, but also differences, reflecting namely the failing sense of "mine-ness" of the experiential world and a tendency to confuse the self with the world, others, or both.

=== EASE items ===
Domain 1: Stream of consciousness

Symptom	Description
1.1 Thought interference	Thoughts that are not semantically related to the main line of thinking pop up and interfere with it; these thoughts are generally irrelevant and unimportant.
1.2 Loss of thought ipseity	Thoughts appear strange in that they do not seem as if they originate from the self; the person is rationally aware that these thoughts are theirs.
1.3 Thought pressure	Many thoughts appearing simultaneously or in rapid succession that lack a common theme, which the person feels they cannot control.
1.4 Thought block	The train of thought comes to a halt.
1.4.1 Blocking	The thought becomes lost and inaccessible and no new thought appears in its place.
1.4.2 Fading	The thought slowly fades away with no new thought appearing.
1.4.3 Fading combined with simultaneous or successive thought interference	The thought slowly fades away while a new thought begins to appear.
1.5 Silent thought echo	A thought which is not perceptualized is repeated or doubled.
1.6 Ruminations-obsessions	Persistence or recurrence of thoughts.
1.6.1 Primary ruminations	Tendency to ruminate with no underlying reason.
1.6.2 Secondary ruminations	Tendency to ruminate secondary to another issue, such as perplexity.
1.6.3 True obsessions	Recurring thoughts that are not macabre and which the person attempts to resist.
1.6.4 Pseudo-obsessions	Recurring thoughts that tend to have violent, sexual, or otherwise aggressive content that are generally not resisted by the person. In the ICD-10's definition of schizotypal disorder these are called "obsessive ruminations", and they tend to play out like movies or series of projections in a space internal to the person's mind, located perhaps "on an inner screen" or "behind [their] eyes", that they passively watch and may also inspect.
1.6.5 Compulsions	Rituals in relation to ruminations or obsessions.
1.7 Perceptualization of inner speech or thought	Thoughts acquire perceptual qualities, which may appear to occur in the head or outside the person (hallucinations).
1.7.1 Internal	The person experiences these perceptions as occurring inside the head.
1.7.2 Equivalents	Thoughts appear as written text.
1.7.3 Internal as a psychotic first-rank symptom	Person believes the thoughts are so loud that they can be heard by others.
1.7.4 External	Person experiences hallucinations, which may seem to repeat their thoughts.
1.8 Spatializaton of experience	Internal experiences such as thoughts appear as if they occurred inside an internal space; the person may experience them as being like physical objects appearing in that space.
1.9 Ambivalence	Difficulty deciding between 2 or more insignificant options.
1.10 Inability to discriminate modalities of intentionality	Person has difficulty telling the difference between perceptions and imaginations and between true memories and dreams.
1.11 Disturbance of thought initiative or thought intentionality	Difficulty initiating and organizing goal-directed activities.
1.12 Attentional disturbances	(see subtypes)
1.12.1 Captivation of attention by a detail in the perceptual field	Person is drawn to aspects of the environment which are hard to divert attention away from, even though the person has no particular interest in those details.
1.12.2 Inability to split attention	The person cannot do 2 or more activities at the same time which use different senses.
1.13 Disorder of short-term memory	Difficulty keeping things in mind for a short period of time experienced as a tendency to forget things from the beginning as the person continues, such as in reading a story.
1.14 Disturbance in experience of time	Change in the flow of time, not including changes in flow speed caused by boredom or pleasure, or regarding past vs. future.
1.14.1 Disturbance in the subjective experience of time flow	Time seems to speed up, slow down, stand still, or become fragmented.
1.14.2 Disturbance in the existential time	The future is blocked and existence seems to be dominated by either the present or the past.
1.15 Discontinuous awareness of own action	Break in awareness of own actions.
1.16 Discordance between intended expression and the expressed	The person experiences their expression as being uncontrollable, distorting the meaning of what the person is actually trying to say.
1.17 Disturbance of expressive language function	The person experiences difficulty in mobilizing the words needed to express themselves.

Domain 2: Self-awareness and presence

Symptom	Description
2.1 Diminished sense of basic self	Feelings as if one is, for example, ephemeral, non-existent, profoundly different from others (but unable to sufficiently elaborate on this), or that one must agree with others; this has occurred chronically since at least adolescence.
2.1.1 Childhood onset	Onset was before puberty.
2.1.2 Adolescence onset	Onset was in adolescence.
2.2 Distorted first-person perspective	There are at least 3 subtypes.
2.2.1	Person feels as if their experiences aren't their own, at least briefly, or as if they were a mere inanimate object.
2.2.2	Person feels an incredible distance between the self and experience, resulting in intense and involuntary constant or recurring self-monitoring.
2.2.3	Person feels as if the self were located at a specific point in space, or perhaps as if it were a physical object, or both.
2.3 Other states of depersonalization	Sense of alienation from self or one's own experience.
2.3.1 Melancholiform depersonalization	Melancholic mood change from which the person feels alienated.
2.3.2 Unspecified depersonalization	Other depersonalization
2.4 Diminished presence	An increased distance from being affected by the world that is experienced by the person as originating from within the self; this is experienced as an affliction by the person.
2.4.1 Specified	Increasing distance from the world experienced as apathy towards specific events.
2.4.2 Unspecified	Sense of barrier between self and world that cannot be furthered specified by the person.
2.4.3 Including derealization or perceptual change	Where the sense of barrier results in a change in world perception (e.g. sense of fogginess) or is accompanied by derealization.
2.5 Derealization	The world appears as strange, alien, unreal, or changed.
2.5.1 Fluid (global) derealization	The world seems to lose its color or become lifeless, or there is some other diminution of the qualities of the world.
2.5.2 Intrusive derealization	Things in the world seem much more intrusive than normal, which strongly affect the person emotionally.
2.6 Hyperreflectivity; increased reflectivity	Tendency to engage in excessive reflection of matters involving the self or other things hindering the sense of being able to live carefree or spontaneously; person will engage in intense reflection while engaged in activity (called also "simultaneous introspection" in Japanese psychopathology).
2.7 I-split	Sense that the self does not exist as a unified whole beyond having a multifaceted personality.
2.7.1 I-split suspected	When person's comments hint at I-split.
2.7.2	Person reports non-psychotic experience of I-split.
2.7.3	Person reports non-psychotic experience of I-split that is experienced in a way that the different pieces of self exist at different points in space like physical objects.
2.7.4	Person reports delusional experience of I-split.
2.8 Dissociative depersonalization (out of body experience)	Person experiences the self as if it were outside the body.
2.8.1	Person feels as if this is occurring, without hallucinating.
2.8.2	Person experiences this as a dissociative hallucination.
2.9 Identity confusion	Person feels as if they were another person.
2.10 Sense of change in relation to chronological age	Feeling as if the person were very much younger or older than they really are.
2.11 Sense of change in relation to gender	(see subtypes)
2.11.1	Person worries that they might be gay.
2.11.2	Person is confused about their sex or feels as if they were the opposite sex.
2.12 Loss of common sense/perplexity/lack of natural evidence	Person is confused about the meaning of what people normally understand implicitly and may spend a lot of time wondering why, say, the sky is blue or 2+2=4; or person may follow extremely rigid schemas that come across as bizarre to others ("morbid rationalism") or may have a tendency to obsess about the spatial or geometric aspects of the world ("geometrism").
2.13 Anxiety	(see subtypes)
2.13.1 Panic attacks with autonomous symptoms	Panic accompanied by multiple autonomic symptoms including labored breathing, heart racing, chest pain, or a sense of choking.
2.13.2 Psychic-mental anxiety	Feeling of anxiety without autonomic symptoms.
2.13.3 Phobic anxiety	Anxiety triggered by specific fears (e.g. agoraphobia).
2.13.4 Social anxiety	Anxiety caused by social situations.
2.13.5 Diffuse, free-floating, and pervasive anxiety	Intense, constant anxiety.
2.13.6 Paranoid anxiety	Anxiety triggered by paranoid fears.
2.14 Ontological anxiety	Pervasive anxiety experienced by person over their own existence that causes them to be more interested in survival than in self-realization; it can involve a sense as if something ominous were approaching, a sense of being exposed to others, or some other fear of violation of their own existence.
2.15 Diminished transparency of consciousness	A sense that one is blocked from clearly perceiving the contents of consciousness which is not secondary to something else (e.g. thought pressure, organic brain disorder, or clinical depression).
2.16 Diminished initiative	Pervasive difficulty initiating goal-directed activity that is not secondary to, for example, clinical depression.
2.17 Hypohedonia	Pervasive and recurring diminished capacity for pleasure.
2.18 Diminished vitality	Sense of diminishment of one's vital energy that is not secondary to, for example, clinical depression.
2.18.1 State-like	Experienced only episodically.
2.18.1 Trait-like	Experienced chronically.

Domain 3: Bodily experiences

Symptom	Description
3.1 Morphological change	Sensations or perceptions as if parts of the body or the entire body has changed size or shape.
3.1.1	Due to paroxysmal sensations.
3.1.2	Due to perception.
3.2 Mirror-related phenomena	Frequently looking at mirrors or avoiding mirrors, or otherwise feeling as if the shape of the face has changed when looking in a mirror.
3.2.1	The person only looks in the mirror to see if their face has changed, but perceives no change.
3.2.2	Perceived change or distortion of the face.
3.2.3	Other mirror-related phenomena.
3.3 Somatic depersonalization (bodily estrangement)	Feeling alienated from one's body or its parts.
3.4 Psychophysical misfit and psychophysical split	The body feels as if it does not fit (but not simply because the person dislikes their appearance) or a feeling as if the body and mind do not go together.
3.5 Bodily disintegration	Feeling as if the body is falling to pieces.
3.6 Spatialization of bodily experiences	Feeling as if parts of the body were no longer a medium for action but as if they were simply standalone physical objects, or feeling as if one can feel body parts that one normally cannot feel.
3.7 Cenesthetic experiences	Various unusual bodily sensations, including feelings of numbness, electrical sensations, and thermal sensations.
3.8 Motor disturbances	(see subtypes)
3.8.1 Pseudo-movements of the body	Person feels as if a part of the body is moving, but it actually is not.
3.8.2 Motor interference	Movements of the body intended by the person are derailed, moving in a way not intended by the person.
3.8.3 Motor blocking	Person feels unable to move a body part.
3.8.4 Sense of motor paresis	Usually temporary sense of weakness in one or more limbs, which can interfere with the person's physical movements (such as grasping an object).
3.8.5 Desautomation of movement	Normally automatic or partially automatic physical activities that are carried out on a daily basis or frequently, such as brushing one's hair or riding a bike, can no longer be so, causing the person to have to concentrate and guide each aspect of their movement.
3.9 Mimetic experiences	Pseudo-movements of other objects and people are experienced as if there were a connection to the person's own actions.

Domain 4: Transitivism/demarcation

Symptom	Description
4.1 Confusion with the other	Person confuses their thoughts, feelings, and other aspects with their interlocutor, or otherwise feels invaded or intruded upon by their interlocutor (but cannot explain why this is so).
4.2 Confusion with one's own specular image	Person confuses themselves with their reflection, such as when they are looking in a mirror.
4.3 Threatening bodily contact	(see subtypes)
4.3.1	Person feels threatened by being close to or in contact with another person not because of paranoia or suspicion.
4.3.2	Person feels annihilated when in close contact with another person.
4.4 Passivity mood	Mood-like feeling of being at the mercy of the world, with the person feeling restrained.
4.5 Other transitivistic phenomena	Other feelings as if not properly demarcated from other people and the world.

Domain 5: Existential reorientation

Symptom	Description
5.1 Primary self-reference phenomena	Person feels as if outside events are connected to themselves which cannot be explained by any more primary psychopathology.
5.2 Feeling of centrality	Brief feeling as if being at the center of all existence.
5.3 Feeling as if the subject's experiential field is the only extant reality	Person feels as if only things they are perceiving exist, such that it feels as if things cease to exist when the person looks away, for example.
5.4 "As if" feelings of extraordinary creative power, extraordinary insight into hidden dimensions of reality, or extraordinary insight into own mind or the mind of others.	person experiences a sense as if they possess insight most other people do not.
5.5 "As if" feeling that the experienced world is not truly real, existing, as if it was only somehow apparent, illusory, or deceptive	An example includes feeling as if the person were in a movie.
5.6 Magical ideas (i.e. ideas implying nonphysical causality)	Person feels that they can control things with their mind that they actually cannot, or to otherwise unrealistically control external events.
5.7 Existential or intellectual change	Person experiences a major change in their worldview, such as joining a new religion, that does not occur as part of a manic or hypomanic episode.
5.8 Solipsistic grandiosity	Person feels superior to other people and considers others to be beneath their notice or concern.

== Examination of Anomalous World Experience (EAWE) ==
The EAWE is the companion interview to the EASE that focuses on the person's experiences with the world, rather than with the self. There are 6 domains:

1. Space and objects, which deals with the person's experience with space and physical objects, with disorders including hallucinations, distortions of spatial relationships, and experiences of seeing the same object in multiple ways at the same time (called "contamination" on the Rorschach test).
2. Time and events, which deals with the person's experience with time, with disorders involving time speeding up or slowing down, time breaking up or becoming fragmented, and constant anticipation of something major about to happen.
3. Other persons, which deals with the person's experience of other people, with disorders including disruptions of the sense of ego boundaries with other people, referential ideation based on actions or words by other people, and loss or lack of the ability to naturally understand social situations and social cues leading to attempts to compensate through increased focus or concentration.
4. Language, which deals with reduced fluency and disruption of prose in one's native language, distortions in the person's expression which causes others to misunderstand the person, problems with concrete and abstract concepts, and distraction by individual words and phrases leading to the person having difficulty following what they are reading or listening to.
5. Atmosphere, which deals with the person's overall feeling-state of the world, with disorders including derealization (particularly The Truman Show-style derealization), objects no longer having normal meaning, hyper-awareness of things that normally stay in the background of awareness, apophanous mood, and a sense of radical changes in the very structure of the universe itself.
6. Existential orientation, which deals with radical changes in a person's worldview, dealing with such things as rejecting society's conventions and rules, being extremely open to believing new ideas, and grandiosity which involves the person considering others to be inferior, like insects compared to them.

=== EAWE items ===
Domain 1: Space and objects

Symptom	Description
1.1 Abnormal intensity or persistence of visual perceptions	Visual stimuli appear more or less intense or take longer to leave perception after ending.
1.1.1 Increase in intensity of visual perceptions*	Visual stimuli seem more intense, such as light being brighter or colors stronger.
1.1.2 Decrease in intensity of visual perceptions*	Visual stimuli seem less intense.
1.1.3 Recurrence or prolongation of visual stimuli	Even after visual stimuli are gone, person continues to see them. Also called palinopsia.
1.2 Blindness or partial blindness	Vision is experienced as being blurry or partially or wholly absent.
1.2.1 Blurred vision*	
1.2.2 Partial seeing	Person sees only part of an object.
1.2.3 Transitory blindness	Visual field is experienced as either partly or entirely absent.
1.3 Disturbances involving verticality (accuracy) of visual perceptions*	Mis-seeing objects or perceiving visual stimuli that is actually absent.
1.3.1 Visual illusions*	Person mis-sees something, mistaking it for something else.
1.3.2 Visual hallucinations*	Person experiences seeing something when nothing is there. Can seem only partially external.
1.3.3 Visual pseudohallucinations*	Like visual hallucinations, but person while experiencing it recognizes its lack of basis in reality.
1.4 Visual fragmentation	Objects or scenes appear broken up.
1.4.1 Object fragmentation	Cannot perceive objects as a whole.
1.4.2 Break-up of a scene	The world becomes fragmented, with different things appearing disconnected or unrelated to one another.
1.4.3 Captivation of attention by isolated details	Person attracted to certain details as if spellbound.
1.5 Disorganization or disturbed object stability	Visual perception of things becomes fluid and unstable.
1.5.1 Disorganized object contours	Object contours are distorted.
1.5.2 Loss of perceptual stability (fluidity or contamination)	Things seem to change their form or nature before the person's very eyes. Multiple forms of a single object may be perceived simultaneously in the same place, like a "photographic double exposure". (See also the fluidity and contamination ratings on the Rorschach test.)
1.6 Changes in quality, size, or shape of visual perceptions	
1.6.1 Changes in color of visual perceptions	Things seem to be a different color from what they normally are.
1.6.2 Micropsia/macropsia	Things seem bigger or smaller than they actually are.
1.6.3 Dysmegalopsia	Things seem bigger on one side and smaller on the other than they actually are.
1.6.4 Metamorphopsia	Objects have a different but stable form than how they actually are.
1.6.5 Other distortions	
1.7 Disturbances of perceptual distance or object juxtaposition	Distances and/or relative positioning of objects to each other is distorted.
1.7.1 Objects seem closer or farther away*	Objects are closer or farther than they appear.
1.7.2 Disturbance of relative spatial relationship (juxtaposition) of objects	The relative positioning of objects is distorted, including in the perception of 2 objects one of which is closer, with the closer one appearing farther away and the farther away one appearing closer. May have difficulty determining what is in the background or foreground.
1.7.3 General disturbances in estimation of distance	Person struggles to estimate how far away they are from something.
1.8 Distorted experiences of space	Space itself seems distorted.
1.8.1 Diminished perspectival orientation	Experiences space as isotropic, sees the world as if standing from nowhere in particular or everywhere at once.
1.8.2 Loss of topographical orientation	Feels disoriented in familiar places.
1.8.3 Loss of spatial integrity or structure	Feels as if space is inconsistent, as if pouring a jug of water down on the floor below results in the water falling onto the floor above or as if a path leads somewhere that should be geometrically impossible.
1.8.4 Loss of dimensionality	Perceives the world in only 2 dimensions.
1.8.5 Experience of infinite space	Person is overwhelmed by the magnitude of space in their location.
1.8.6 Figure/ground reversal	Person sees the space between objects rather than the objects themselves.
1.8.7 Affective experience of space*	Space feels threatening or strange, takes on a negative feel.
1.9 Abnormal intensity or persistence of auditory perceptions	Sounds seem more or less intense or last longer than they should.
1.9.1 Increases in intensity of auditory perceptions*	Sounds seem louder or more intense.
1.9.2 Decreases in intensity of auditory perceptions*	Sounds seem quieter or less intense.
1.9.3 Heightened awareness of background auditory sensations	Overly aware of sounds that should remain in the background, that are less relevant than other more important sounds.
1.9.4 Recurrence or prolongation of auditory stimuli	Sounds last longer than they should or recur.
1.10 Disturbances involving veridicality (accuracy) of auditory perceptions*	Mis-hearing sounds or hearing sounds that aren't there.
1.10.1 Auditory illusions*	Mis-hears sounds as something else.
1.10.2 Auditory hallucinations*	Hears sounds that aren't there, in a way that seems at least somewhat external to the person.
1.10.3 Auditory pseudohallucinations*	Like auditory hallucinations, but person is aware during the experience that they are false.
1.11 Other changes in quality of auditory perceptions	Experiences distortions in pitch, timbre, or other qualities of some or all sounds.
1.12 Problems localizing sounds	Has trouble pinpointing where sounds are coming from.
1.13 Disturbances of other senses*	Other senses, such as smell, taste, or touch, experience distortions.
1.13.1 Tactile disturbance*	Distortions in the sense of touch.
1.13.2 Gustatory disturbance*	Distortions in the sense of taste.
1.13.3 Olfactory disturbance*	Distortions in the sense of smell.
1.14 Synesthesia or abnormal concommitant perception*	Stimulus in one sense brings in involvement of another sense.
1.15 Splitting-off or isolation of sensory perceptions	Stimulus is perceived as having nothing to do with what is producing the stimulus, like another person's voice seems to have nothing to do with the person who is speaking.
1.16 Disturbances in recognizing or identifying an object of perception	Fails to recognize what they are seeing or hearing, even when it is familiar to them.
1.17 Loss of boundaries with, or demarcation from, the physical world	Person experiences difficulty determining where their body ends and the rest of the world begins.

Domain 2: Time and events

Symptom	Description
2.1 Time or movements appear to change speed	This does not only occur when a person is bored, excited, or is engaged in activity.
2.1.1 Time or movements seem speeded up*	
2.1.2 Time or movements seem slowed down*	
2.1.3 Time or movements seem (somehow) both speeded up and slowed down	
2.2 Discrepancy between internal and external time*	Experiences discrepancy between the time that passes for their own actions versus the time for the rest of the world.
2.2.1 Internal time seems slower than external time*	Feels as if they are moving or thinking very slowly relative to the rest of the world.
2.2.2 Internal time seems faster than external time*	Feels as if they are moving or thinking much faster than others and the rest of the world.
2.3 Disruption of dynamic organization of time	Seems like time no longer flows like it should. Here, there is a disruption of the unity of the present moment with the retention (immediate previous moment, "primary remembrance") and the protention (immediate next moment, "anticipation"), as described by philosopher Edmund Husserl.
2.3.1 Time feels as though completely stopped, static, infinite, disappeared	Feels as if time has stopped or ceased to exist.
2.3.2 Time as disjointed or fragmented	Each moment feels disconnected from the last and the next, as if time itself has become staccato, just a sequence of photographs, each having nothing to do with the next or last one.
2.3.3 Disorientation in time	Person becomes confused about the passage of time, with difficulty understanding how time flows and when to engage in events, and even what time of day it is.
2.3.4 Feeling limited to or isolated in the present moment	Person feels as if they newly come into being as a wholly different person with each passing moment of time.
2.3.5 Various bizarre experiences of time	Feels as if time is going backward, as if they are stuck in a Groundhog Day loop, as if they control time, as if they are present in multiple periods of time at once, or other bizarre experiences.
2.4 Disturbed anticipation	Disturbance of the expectation of the immediate next moment in time.
2.4.1 Perpetual anticipation	Constantly feels as if something very big is imminent, right about to happen. Called also ante festum experience or trema ("stage fright").
2.4.2 Constant surprise due to inability to anticipate future events	Is constantly surprised by mundane events that would normally be expected immediately beforehand, due to the inability to anticipate.
2.4.3 Feeling that "anything could happen"	Feeling that literally anything, from the probable through the highly unlikely to the impossible, could happen, while not caring what that is.
2.4.4 Protention (future directedness) collapses	Feels as if they cannot move into the imminent next moments in a smooth, flowing way.
2.5 Disturbed awareness of the expected future*	The conception of the future beyond the imminent is distorted or feared in some way.
2.5.1 Future seems nonexistent*	
2.5.2 Future seems unimportant or irrelevant*	
2.5.3 Future seems threatening*	
2.5.4 Premonitions*	
2.6 Disturbed experiences of memories or of the past	
2.6.1 Past seems cut-off*	
2.6.2 Past seems vague or obscure*	
2.6.3 Past disappears or seems non-existent*	
2.6.4 Past seems accelerated*	Feels as if the memories are all condensed into a single moment.
2.6.5 Past seems slower*	Feels as if memories are all drawn out and elongated in time.
2.6.6 Intrusiveness of the past*	The past seems to limit the person, what they can do.
2.6.7 Erosion of distinction between past and present*	Confused about whether the person is remembering something or if they're actually doing something right now.
2.6.8 Past seems disjointed	What happened in the past seems all out of order, all disconnected from each other, or otherwise disjointed.

Domain 3: Other persons

Symptom	Description
3.1 Lack of social understanding or interpersonal attunement (hypoattunement)	Person feels they cannot smoothly engage with other people at all; may feel like they must study and follow explicit rules to interact successfully with other people.
3.1.1 Loss of social common sense	Feels they cannot naturally grasp what other people do or how the conversation has gone.
3.1.2 Bodily/proprioceptive loss of attunement	Feels they are outward and cannot time their mannerisms and other actions properly (e.g. may not know when to begin speaking after another person has finished, or when to greet a person as they walk past them).
3.1.3 Specific difficulty understanding non-verbal communication	Has difficulty reading body language, tone of voice, and other forms of non-verbal communication.
3.2 Sense of remoteness from others*	Feels cut off from other people.
3.3 Alienated strategies for understanding others	Feels they have to engage in intellectual-style analysis of social situations to understand what they mean and what to do.
3.3.1 Alienated scrutinizing of others' behavior	Aware they tend to analyze social situations to know what they mean, like a zoologist out in the field doing in situ study of animals.
3.3.2 Algorithmic approach to social understanding/interaction	Person attempts to create algorithms, a set of formal rules, to use to guide them in social situations.
3.4 Sense of inferiority, criticism, or mistrust in relation to others*	Tends to feel threatened and criticized in social situations, making it hard to interact comfortably.
3.4.1 Feelings of self-consciousness, self-criticism*	Tends to be overly aware of flaws in their appearance, interaction, etc.
3.4.2 Feelings of social paranoia or social anxiety*	Feels people they're interacting with or are around them are constantly focusing on and judging them.
3.4.3 Pervasive mistrust of others*	Tends to feel other people are out to "get" them.
3.5 Torment or distress due to generalized social insecurity	Mere presence of others feels extremely burdensome and unbearable, as if by their very presence they endanger the person's self.
3.6 Interference by voices*	Feels like voices prevent them from interacting normally with people.
3.7 Disturbance of self-other demarcation	Feels like they have a hard time telling what thoughts, ideas, actions, sayings are in them, and what are in other people.
3.7.1 Hyperattunement	Feels like they can read minds.
3.7.2 Unusual influence over others	Feels like they can mind control other people.
3.7.3 Pathological openness	Feels like their innermost thoughts and feelings are open to being read by others.
3.7.4 Experiences of being controlled	Feels like they're being mind-controlled.
3.7.5 Merging or fluid psychological boundaries	They feel mixed up or confuse their thoughts and feelings with those of other people. May feel like there is no clear boundary between themselves and other people.
3.7.6 Universal merging with others*	Feels like there are no individuals, but everyone is part of the same hive mind or other collective consciousness.
3.7.7 Uncertain personal identity/attitudes*	Feels confused about their identity when around others.
3.7.8 Uncertain physical boundaries	Has difficulty telling where their body ends and other people's bodies begin.
3.7.9 Experience of being imitated	Feels like other people are imitating them deliberately to mess with them or make fun of them, in a way that seems strange to them.
3.8 Difficulties with the gaze	Has trouble with eye contact
3.8.1 Intrusiveness of the gaze of the other	Feels like other people's gazes are very intrusive and make them uncomfortable, often leading to avoidance of eye contact.
3.8.2 Feeling of exposure through one's own eyes	Feels like eye contact exposes their innermost thoughts and feelings to the other person.
3.8.3 Intrusiveness of one's own gaze	Feels like their own gaze is intrusive and unbearable for others.
3.8.4 Dehumanization of the eyes of others	When making eye contact, the other person does not seem to be human or alive, with their eyes and body parts being seen as like inanimate objects.
3.8.5 Eyes as cosmic portals	Feels like the eyes of others (or one's own in the mirror) are windows into another world or dimension.
3.8.6 Unspecific uneasiness with gaze	Feels uneasy with eye contact without specifying the reason.
3.9 Depersonalization of others	Depersonalization, but of other people rather than oneself.
3.9.1 People seem dead*	Feels as if other people are dead (even though they're alive, up and moving around).
3.9.2 People seem unreal/false/illusory	Other people seem like they don't really exist or are fraudulent copies of themselves, without objective reality.
3.9.3 People seem mechanical	Other people seem like they are mere robots without a soul.
3.10 Persons dominated by a single characteristic	Focuses on a single characteristic of other people, and feels as if it defines the other person's entire being, like the other person is nothing more than that characteristic.
3.11 Heightened intensity, aliveness, or reality of others*	People seem more alive and energetic than normal, which feels fishy.
3.12 Changes in quality or tone of others' appearance	Other people look or seem strangely different from how they normally are.
3.12.1 People seem familiar in a strange way	Of people they've never met before, it strangely feels like they know the other person from somewhere. Like deja vu, but with people.
3.12.2 People seem unfamiliar in a strange way	Of people they know well, it strangely feels like they don't know the other person at all. Like Jamais vu, but with people.
3.12.3 People seem disguised*	Feels like other people aren't actually those other people, but are people disguised as those other people.
3.12.4 People seem threatening in a strange way*	There is something about other people that makes it seem like they are a threat.
3.12.5 General/unspecified changes in the physical appearance of others	Something about how the other person looks, like maybe their eyes or face, seems strangely different from before.
3.13 People seem as if communicating something special or unusual (beyond the obvious)	Other people seem to be dropping hints intended for the person, with the intent of the other people's speech being very different from what is said.
3.13.1 Paranoid significance*	The hint seems to express dislike or threats toward the person.
3.13.2 Grandiose significance*	The hint seems to signify the person's superiority or special powers.
3.13.3 Metaphysical significance	The hint seems to signify impending Doomsday or perhaps a cataclysm that has fundamentally altered the universe.
3.13.4 Unknown/unsalatable significance	The person cannot express the meaning of the hint.
3.14 Anomalous behavior/attitudinal responses to others	Person is aware they are acting strangely differently toward other people, often due to paranoia or not understanding social situations like they used to.
3.14.1 Active withdrawal*	Person tends to want to be alone and shut others out.
3.14.2 Oppositional/rebellious behavior*	Person tends to desire counteracting other people.
3.14.3 Social disinhibition*	Person aware they disregard social norms when they interact.
3.14.4 Compulsive interpersonal harmony*	The person feels very eager to please and will do anything to avoid conflict with others.
3.14.5 Extreme compliance	Automatic obedience or imitation of others, echopraxia.
3.14.6 Compulsive clownery/entertainment of others	Feels like they must always crack jokes or clown around, in a way that turns out wooden or stilted to other people.

Domain 4: Language

Symptom	Description
4.1 Basic disruptions of standard verbal comprehension	Difficulty comprehending speech or writings
4.1.1 Meaning/sound dissociation	Difficulty putting the representations of words with their meanings when heard or read
4.1.2 Distraction via semantic possibilities	Gets caught up on all the different senses of a word or a statement that was just heard or read
4.1.3 Distraction by individual words	Gets focused on individual words instead of the message as a whole
4.1.4 Unspecified difficulty understanding	It's difficult to understand what they're hearing or reading
4.2 Difficulty understanding emotional/expressive aspects of speech*	Has a hard time with understanding the intonations in what people say
4.3 Specific changes in standard feel or meaning of words	Becomes focused on words because they feel different than they did before
4.3.1 Focus on sound or appearance of words/phrases*	Very aware of how words sound or appear
4.3.2 Unconventional semantic determination via signifier or fragments of words	Determines words' meanings by how they or parts of them look, rather than by the conventional meaning
4.3.3 Words seem arbitrary/absurd	Is often so distracted by how arbitrary words seem that they do not attend to conversations
4.3.4 Words or language seems alive	Words take on a life of their own or feel like physical objects
4.3.5 Egocentric linguistic reference	Self-referencing ideas coming from the specific words or grammar that a person uses, but NOT the content of what they're saying.
4.4 Unconventional word choice, grammar, tone, or cryptic discourse	Says things in an unusual manner that often confuses people, which may be at least somewhat willful.
4.4.1 Cryptic, telegraphic, or ungrammatical speech	Speaks in a cryptic manner or using sentences structures that violate the grammar of the language they're speaking (even though they are a native speaker, for example), which may be experienced as intentional.
4.4.2 Stock words	Tends to overuse a certain few words or phrases to the point where they acquire many meanings beyond the conventional, causing their speech to feel stilted.
4.4.3 Made-up words (neologisms) or unconventional usage	Aware of using made-up words or using words in ways that differ greatly from their meanings.
4.4.4 Mannerisms and stilted speech	Tends to use very formal registers to say things in situations that would normally call for more casual speech.
4.5 Disturbed fluency	Has a hard time expressing self using language
4.5.1 Unavailability of words	Cannot find the right words
4.5.2 Unfocused or disorganized thoughts preclude verbal expression	Aware they have difficulty speaking because they cannot get their thoughts "straight", that is, their thinking has become so digressive or otherwise difficult to understand that they cannot express themselves
4.5.3 General discordance between the intended expression and the expressed	Aware of inability to express themselves in a way that accurately expresses what they meant to say; little things in the expression keep being off to the point the listener or reader may be left with a different impression.
4.6 Disturbed relevance	Aware of having a hard time remaining on a single line of thought while talking or writing
4.6.1 Derailment*	Aware that they have a tendency to lose track of what they're saying or writing.
4.6.2 Tangential responding	Aware that they make off-topic answers to questions
4.7 Disturbance of linguistic engagement or purposefulness	Aware they speak in such a strange way that they are not engaging
4.7.1 Aprosody (lack of emotional intonation)*	Aware their speech lacks the normal intonation
4.7.2 Echolalia	Feels a need to repeat what the other person says
4.7.3 Speech feels autonomous	Feels like they are not in control of their speaking or writing
4.8 Anomalous experience of the abstract and the concrete	Has difficulty using the abstract and the concrete appropriately
4.8.1 Difficulty with or dislike of abstract concepts	
4.8.2 Abstract rendered in unusually concrete terms	
4.8.3 Specific or concrete meanings rendered in unusually abstract or general terminology	
4.8.4 Hyperabstract or vague discourse	
4.9 Ineffability: inability of language to describe or express (may include temptation to remain silent)	Feels language cannot fully express what they mean to say
4.9.1 Language inadequate to express unusual circumstances*	Feels their experiences are so unusual language becomes inadequate to describe them
4.9.2 General feeling of the inadequacy of the language	Feels language is inadequate to describe even normal experiences, or otherwise sees the use of language as a waste of time
4.10 Alienation from self-description	When they provide a narrative of one's life, they have difficulty with even recognizing the person back them as themselves.

Domain 5: Atmosphere

Symptom	Description
5.1 Derealization of the world	Sense of disconnection or unreality of the world
5.1.1 Remoteness or barrier (plate-glass feeling)*	Feels cut off from the world
5.1.2 Decreased intensity or substantiality*	The world seems flat
5.1.3 Deanimation*	The world seems lifeless
5.1.4 Falseness	The whole world feels like it is a stage
5.1.5 Loss of enticement quality*	Nothing has any appeal
5.1.6 Static quality, stillness, or morbid intellectualism	Looks at the world in a very static or geometric way
5.1.7 Nonspecific/other derealization*	The world feels strange in some way
5.2 Loss of affordances	Objects and events no longer have their normal meaning and are seen simply as fixtures on the world.
5.3 Inanimate things seem alive or intentional*	
5.4 Heightened intensity/hyperrealization*	The world feels somehow more alive, colorful, and intense than normal.
5.5 Deja vu experiences	Things feel familiar somehow or like they've happened before.
5.6 Jamais vu experiences	The familiar becomes unfamiliar and novel
5.7 Perplexity	Reality becomes confusing
5.7.1 Confusion of realms	Difficulty distinguishing the internal, mental realm and the physical realm.
5.7.2 Unreal interferes	Delusions or imaginations interfere with the ability to live in the world.
5.7.3 World experienced as incoherent, disoriented	The world is no longer a fixed stable place of meaning, but has become confusing and incoherent.
5.7.4 Perplexing hyperawareness of tacit dimension	Things that would normally stay in the background of perception come to the foreground and are the focus of attention.
5.8 Anomalous manner of ascribing or perceiving meaning	The way the person derives meaning from things changes greatly
5.8.1 Meaning imposed on object by subject	Person tends to give their own idiosyncratic meaning to things
5.8.2 Meaning inherent in the object itself	The idiosyncratic meaning is perceived as soon as the object comes into perspective and is seen as intrinsic to the object.
5.8.3 Proliferation of meanings from the object	Perceiving the object causes an uncontrollable emergence of associations, that is, things that it reminds the person of.
5.9 Anomalous forms of meaning	Meaning given to objects tend to be very atypical, often in terms of the concrete and the abstract
5.9.1 Physical or literalist instantiation of abstract meaning	Things like thoughts and feelings become hard and concrete, like they were physical objects in themselves.
5.9.2 Anomalous classification	Tends to classify different things together using unusual criteria
5.10 Intensified awareness of patterns or trends*	Increased tendency to see patterns in things
5.11 Anomalous sense of causal relationships	Cause and effect become distorted.
5.11.1 Actions or events seem controlled by an external force or will	
5.11.2 Actions or events seem predetermined or planned	
5.12 All-inclusive self-consciousness/ontological paranoia	Keeps feeling like they are being watched, focused on
5.13 Diminished ontological independence of experienced world/subjectivism	The world lacks independence from the mind.
5.13.1 Subjectivism/solipsism	The person feels like they are the only mind in the universe and that they are the ones who build up the universe and bring things and people into being.
5.13.2 Double bookkeeping	Aware of two different realities, one real and physical, the other imaginary and delusional.
5.13.3 Influencing physical reality	Feels like their thoughts control the world
5.13.4 Pseudomovements of objects/persons	When the person is moving, it feels like things or people are moving in conjunction with them.
5.14 Revelatory or pseudorelevatory (apophanous) mood	There is something different, special, or unusual about the world, but the person cannot grasp it, filling them with wonder.
5.14.1 Uncanny particularity	Something seems peculiar about various mundane happenings in the world, like they signify something bigger happening behind the scenes.
5.14.2 Self-referentiality	Sees mundane things as referring back to themselves in one of various ways, listed below.
5.14.2.a Paranoid significance*	Suggests someone is trying to harm them
5.14.2.b Grandiose significance	Suggests they are superior or special in some way
5.14.2.c Metaphysical significance	Suggests the entire universe has radically changed, with the implication that it is the person who is response, or the message is directed specifically toward them.
5.14.2.d Unknown/unsalatable significance	The nature of the significance is unknown.
5.14.3 Unspecifiable strangeness	Something has changed, the person can sense it, but they don't know exactly what.
5.15 Quasi-mystical experiences	Amazed at the very existence of the world
5.15.1 Mystic union with the world*	Feels especially connected and united with the world, but not in a way that suggests their ego boundaries have been compromised.
5.15.2 Mere being	Struck by the sheer existence of everything
5.16 Experiences of the end of the world	Feels like the world is ending.
5.17 Anomalies of mood or affect	The person has entered into an unusual mood state
5.17.1 Emptiness, numbness, indifference, lack of spontaneous response to the world*	
5.17.2 Feeling of emotional/affective blockage (in the sense of being unable to express)*	
5.17.3 Pervasive, nameless anxiety with fear of annihilation*	
5.17.4 Basic irritation, restlessness, anger (nonemotional dysphoria)*	
5.17.5 Detached euphoria	Feels euphoric, but in a way that is very disconnected, different than the euphoria in a manic state which tends to involve increased energy and actions toward goals.
5.17.6 Despair, demoralization, hopelessness*	
5.17.7 Abnormalities of mood constancy*	
5.17.7.a Mood or emotion is abnormally present*	Feels like the mood lasts beyond the events or thoughts that triggered it.
5.17.7.b Mood or emotion is abnormally labile*	Mood keeps changing
5.17.8 Incongruity of mood or emotion	
5.17.8.a Mood or emotion inappropriate to the current situation	Has moods or emotional reactions one would expect to what's going on
5.17.8.b Moods or emotions are mutually contradictory	Very high level of ambivalence about how they feel about things

Domain 6: Existential orientation

Symptom	Description
6.1 Rejection of society or convention	The person generally chooses to live according to their rules in disregard of societal norms.
6.1.1 Disinclination for human society	Person rejects society and would prefer to live as a misfit.
6.1.2 Antagonomia	Tends to act in ways that directly oppose societal values.
6.1.3 Idionomia	Person feels radically unique.
6.2 Extreme indifference or openness	Person is very open to all possibilities in a way suggesting they are detached from the normal concerns of life.
6.2.1 Attitude of indifference, insouciance, lack of concern	Expresses "callous indifference" and that nothing really matters, in a way suggesting cold detachment, different from the way indifference is typically expressed in mood disorders where there is a strong emotional component.
6.2.2 Conceptual freedom/anything goes	Feels like anything could happen: as far as they're concerned, for example, apples could just as easily start falling up from trees rather than down.
6.3 Pervasive disbelief, skepticism, or curiosity re the obvious, taken-for-granted	Constant tendency to question everything that society takes for granted.
6.4 Absolute certitude	The person is absolutely sure about their unusual interpretation of the world, and does not believe that it will ever be refuted.
6.5 Feeling of being special or superior	Person feels superior or like they have a special role to play in the universe.
6.5.1 Feeling of extraordinary insight*	Person feels as if they and they alone understand the mysteries of the world.
6.5.2 Messianic duty*	Person feels as if they are a savior the world is depending on.
6.5.3 Intellectual/spiritual grandiosity (with invidious comparison)	Person feels as if they are much much more highly advanced and evolved than all other people, whom they view as vastly inferior.
6.6 Impossible responsibility or guilt*	Person feels guilty over things they could not have done.
6.7 Sense of loss of freedom or individuality	Feels as if they are controlled by outside forces.
6.8 Adherence to abstract, intellectualistic, and/or autonomous rules	Person follows self-imposed "rational" rules that are quite idiosyncratic.
6.9 Existential or intellectual change*	Person suddenly is absorbed by things like religion or philosophy.
6.10 Feeling of centrality	Person feels as if the universe revolves around them.
6.11 Decentering of the self relative to universe	Feels as if they are not really real, like they truly exist apart from the universe.

*Indicates experience that can also occur in other primary psychotic or mood disorders outside the schizophrenia spectrum, such as delusional disorder, major depressive disorder, or bipolar disorder.

== Clinical relevance ==
The presence of self-disorders may have predictive power for whether those with an at risk mental state will develop psychosis; the risk of suicidal ideation and suicide by people with schizophrenia, though depression would also be an important factor; predicting initial social dysfunction in people with either schizophrenic or bipolar psychosis; and whether a person will move to a schizophrenia spectrum diagnosis later.

Considering the presence of self-disorders is useful when attempting to differentially diagnose disorders that can be confused with schizophrenia spectrum disorders. Autism spectrum disorder and schizotypal personality disorder can appear outwardly similar but have different etiologies and require different treatment approaches. The presence of self-disorders is evidence for a diagnosis of schizotypal personality disorder over autism spectrum disorder. Likewise, in the case of first instance psychosis, self-disorders are indicative of a diagnosis of schizophrenia in favor of other psychotic disorders.

The presence of self-disorders may cause reduced person insight into their illness through the alteration of the basic structures of consciousness.

Self-disorders are difficult for the people experiencing them to articulate spontaneously; and are not well-known, by either the general public or professionals in the field. Because of this, people will often make vague, clichéd complaints that mimic the symptoms of other mental disorders, symptoms such as "fatigue" or "concentration difficulties". Were a knowledgeable clinician to probe deeper, however, the underlying self-disorders may be assessed and help clarify the nature of the person's illness. In their review, Parnas, et al. (2014) say, "The psychiatrist's acquaintance with the phenomenon of 'non-specific specificity' is, in our view, extremely important in the context of early diagnostic assessment, especially of people presenting with a vague, unelaborated picture of maladjustment, underperformance, chronic malaise and dysphoria, negative symptoms, or hypochondriac preoccupations." People with schizophrenia often describe their self-disorders as causing more suffering for them than psychosis.

Self-disorders underlie most of the first-rank symptoms, those often termed passivity phenomena. There is a current proposal to list self-disorder as one of the symptoms of schizophrenia in the upcoming ICD-11.

== Evidence ==
The first systematic review of empirical studies on self-disorders based on the EASE scale was published in 2021. It found consistent support for the concept as a characteristic component of schizophrenia spectrum disorders and not other mental disorders. Another systematic review and meta-analysis from 2022 covering an aggregated sample of 810 patients found good evidence to support the existence of self-disorders as core clinical feature in schizophrenia spectrum disorders. The concept and its link to schizophrenia was likewise supported by a 2021 meta-analysis.

== Future directions and controversy ==
In a 2014 review, Postmes, et al., suggested that self-disorders and psychosis may arise from attempts to compensate for perceptual incoherence and proposed a hypothesis for how the interaction among these phenomena and the person's attempts to resolve the incoherence give rise to schizophrenia. The problems with the integration of sensory information create problems for the person in keeping a grip on the world, and since the self-world interaction is fundamentally linked to the basic sense of self, the latter is also disrupted as a result. Sass and Borda have studied the correlates of the dimensions of self-disorders, namely disturbed grip (perplexity, difficulty "getting" stuff most people can get), hyperreflexivity (where thoughts, feelings, sensations, and objects pop up uncontrollably in the field of awareness, as well dysfunctional reflecting on matters and the self), and diminished self-affection (where the person has difficulty being "affected" by aspects of the self, experiencing those aspects as if they existed in an outer space), and have proposed how both primary and secondary factors may arise from dysfunctions in perceptual organization and multisensory integration.

In a 2013 review, Mishara, et al., criticized the concept of the minimal self as an explanation for self-disorder, saying that it is unfalsifiable, and that self-disorder arises primarily from difficulty integrating different aspects of the self as well as having difficulty distinguishing self and other, as proposed by Lysaker and Lysaker: Ichstörung or ego disorder, as they say, in schizophrenia arises from disturbed relationships, and not from the "solipsistic" concept of the self as proposed by Sass, Parnas, and others. In his review, Sass agrees that the focus of research into self-disorder has focused too much on the self, and mentions attempts to look at disturbances in the person's relationship with other people and the world, with work being done to create an Examination of Anomalous World Experience, which will look at the person's anomalous experiences regarding time, space, persons, language, and atmosphere; he suggests there are problems with both the self and the world in people with self-disorder, and that it may be better conceptualized as a "presence-disturbance". Parnas acknowledges the Lysaker model, but says that it is not incompatible with the concept of the minimal self, as they deal with different levels of self-hood.

== History ==
The concept of a basic self-disturbance in schizophrenia appears in all the foundational texts on the disease. The basic symptoms of schizophrenia include descriptions of self-disorders. Likewise, Kurt Schneider's first-rank symptoms, especially his concept of ego disturbances as well as the so-called passivity phenomena may be considered as examples of self-disorders. Similar concepts were also discussed by Karl Jaspers. The concept of "ontological insecurity", which resembles self-disorder, was proposed by R. D. Laing in 1960.

The publication of the DSM-III (1980) lead to an increased emphasis on concrete signs and symptoms of mental disorders over the subjective experiences underlying those symptoms; in other words, it privileged a behaviorist approach to diagnosis. Because the concept of self-disorders had been difficult to operationalize, it began to be criticized as overly vague and too subjective; indeed, little systematic or empirical research was done on the concept in the 20th century. It therefore began to fall out of clinical use and soon disappeared entirely from training programs in the United States.

A notable exception to this trend was the Bonn Scale for the Assessment of Basic Symptoms (BSABS), created in the 1980s to assess sub-clinical affective, cognitive and perceptual disturbances, as well as basic self-disturbance. In many studies, basic symptoms as measured by the BSABS were found to aggregate in people with schizophrenic and schizotypal disorders.

In early 2000s, a group of researchers including Danish psychiatrist Josef Parnas sought to operationalize and revive the idea of schizophrenia as a disorder of the minimal self. This work resulted in the creation of the EASE, which was published in 2005. The scale was based on phenomenological interviews with first-admission people with schizophrenia spectrum disorders, to enable empirical research of self-disorders. It was also partially based on the BSABS, but more focused on items relating specifically to disturbed self-experience. The creation of the EASE resulted in an uptick in research into the topic, and the first systematic review of the concept was published in The Lancet Psychiatry in 2021, finding good empirical support for self-disorders as a defining characteristic of schizophrenia spectrum disorders.

== See also ==
- Attribution (psychology)
- Center for Subjectivity Research
- Schizotypy
