= Josef Parnas =

Danish psychiatrist

Josef Parnas (born 1950) is a Danish psychiatrist. He is Professor of Psychiatry at the University of Copenhagen, as well as a co-founder and senior researcher at the Center for Subjectivity Research. He worked on the creation of the Examination of Anomalous Self-Experience scale, which has played an important role in enabling empirical study of self-disorders in schizophrenia spectrum disorders.
