= At risk mental state =

Clinical presentation

At risk mental state, also referred to as clinical high risk (CHR) or ultra high risk (UHR), is the clinical presentation of those considered at risk of developing psychosis or schizophrenia. Such states were formerly considered as prodromal phases, during which individuals experience non-specific or attenuated symptoms of psychosis until the onset of an initial psychotic episode, but this view is no longer prevalent as a prodromal period cannot be confirmed unless the emergence of the condition has occurred.

The original specialist service for those with subclinical symptoms of psychosis was The Pace Clinic in Melbourne, Australia. Other clinics have since developed around the world.

== Diagnostic criteria ==
Individuals who meet criteria for CHR often experience both positive symptoms (i.e., symptoms that reflect a loss of contact with reality, including delusions, hallucinations, and disorganized thoughts/behavior) and negative symptoms (i.e., symptoms that represent a deficit in experiences, such as blunted affect, anhedonia, avolition, and asociality) that do not meet the threshold for a chronic psychotic disorder. As the conceptualization of psychosis has evolved towards understanding psychotic experiences on a spectrum, the task of defining the cutoffs for thresholds of what meets criteria for a disorder vs. a state of enhanced risk vs. normative experience, has been a topic of active debate.

Within a spectrum-model of psychosis, the CHR state has been demonstrated to be specific for the development of chronic psychosis, as individuals who meet criteria for CHR are not at enhanced risk for developing other mental health disorders, such as bipolar or other mood disorders and anxiety disorders. Despite this specificity of CHR criteria, the CHR population is quite heterogeneous, such that only approximately 20-30% of individuals who meet criteria will transition to a chronic psychotic disorder. Due to this heterogeneity, defining diagnostic criteria that maintain specificity while improving accuracy of predicting conversion has proven to be challenging.

=== Assessment for CHR ===
A variety of different instruments have been developed to identify individuals meeting CHR criteria, with the most popular being the Structured Interview for Psychosis-Risk Syndromes (SIPS) and the Comprehensive Assessment of At-Risk Mental States (CAARMS), which were harmonized into a single instrument in 2024, the Positive SYmptoms and Diagnostic Criteria for the CAARMS Harmonized with the SIPS (PSYCHS). Symptoms are described with respect to their severity, frequency, and attribution (i.e., symptoms cannot be attributed to another disorder). However, in spite of the harmonization efforts, the persisting differences in the CHR criteria between these instruments, such as the length of time during which symptoms are present (e.g., SIPS requires symptoms to be present within the last month, whereas CAARMS considers symptoms over the past year), reflect the heterogeneous nature of the population and the challenges of identifying the salient features of the high risk state.

==== Risk syndromes ====
Within the framework of the SIPS and CAARMS, there are three distinct risk syndromes. While there is considerable overlap between the criteria between the two instruments for each of the three risk subgroups, meta-analyses have revealed cross-instrument divergence in predicting conversion for each subgroup.

Brief (Limited) Intermittent Psychotic Syndrome is characterized by the presence of brief, time-limited intermittent positive symptoms that are fully psychotic in severity. In the framework of the SIPS, this subgroup is referred to as BIPS, and fully psychotic experiences (e.g., delusions, hallucinations, unusual thoughts, disorganized behavior) must be present for at least several minutes in the past month, but symptoms cannot be experienced on a daily basis, nor last over an hour if they are experienced between 3 and 6 days a week. In the framework of the CAARMS, this risk syndrome is described as BLIPS and similarly requires the presence of fully psychotic symptoms at any point in the past year, with symptoms having resolved within one week without use of antipsychotic medication. Evidence from meta-analyses suggests that although inter-rater agreement between the BIPS and BLIPS is poorer than that of other risk syndromes, this subgroup nonetheless presents with a greater risk of conversion, which has led some to argue that BIPS/BLIPS should be removed from CHR and that its prognosis does not differ significantly from that of brief psychotic disorder. The enhanced conversion risk in BIPS aligns with findings that have identified the severity of symptoms as being one of the most influential predictors of conversion.

Attenuated Positive Symptoms Syndrome is characterized by the presence of positive symptoms that are not fully psychotic in their severity (e.g., lower degree of conviction endorsed in unusual beliefs, such that individual is able to generate doubt about beliefs). The framework of the SIPS requires that these attenuated positive symptoms must occur at least once per week for a month to meet criteria for the APSS subgroup, while the CAARMS defines this risk syndrome as APS and requires symptoms to have been experienced in the past year at a frequency of at least once per month and up to 2 days a week for greater than an hour during each occurrence, or between 3 and 6 days a week for less than an hour. Within the APS subgroup, the CAARMS also includes individuals who have experienced positive symptoms at fully psychotic intensity, but at similar subthreshold frequency. The most prevalent subgroup within CHR populations is those who meet criteria for attenuated positive symptoms, and meta-analyses reveal good between-instrument agreement between the SIPS and the CAARMS in terms of predicting conversion within this subgroup.

Within the framework of the SIPS, Genetic Risk and Deterioration Syndrome (GRDS) is characterized by family history of a first-degree relative with psychosis or schizotypal personality disorder, accompanied by a significant decline (i.e., a 30% drop) in social or occupational functioning over any month in the past year. This subgroup is referred to as a Vulnerability Group in the CAARMS, and also includes those who experience a sustained level of poor functioning for at least the past year. This subgroup has been identified as being the least common in CHR populations. Its relative rarity have posed a challenge for the accurate prediction of conversion rates, particularly since many individuals who meet criteria for GRDS and transition to chronic psychosis also meet criteria for either APSS or BIPS.

== Prognosis ==
There has been some considerable development of how the concept can be applied clinically. In the revision of the DSM-5, attenuated psychosis syndrome was included as a diagnosis as an Other Specified Schizophrenia Spectrum and Other Psychotic Disorder. However, there has been debate over its inclusion, particularly regarding the benefit-to-harm ratio of intervening with antipsychotic medication for false positives (i.e., individuals who meet criteria for CHR, but do not transition to chronic psychosis). As psychosis research moves beyond a model where schizophrenia is the de facto prototypical psychotic disorder and towards a conceptualization of a psychosis spectrum, it has been argued that goals of clinical intervention should shift accordingly to emphasize treatment of persistent, non-specific psychopathology that affects CHR individuals, even those who do not convert.

=== For converters ===
CHR criteria are sensitive to risk for imminent onset of psychosis, such that the incidence rate of conversion decelerates substantially after 2.5 to 3 years, and most CHR individuals who transition to chronic psychosis will do so within the first year upon identification, with approximately 80% of conversions occurring within the first two years.

==== Risk factors ====
For those who go on to transition to chronic psychosis, severity of positive symptoms is among the strongest risk factors associated with conversion, with more mixed evidence in support of the duration of symptoms being a significant predictor of transition. Other important risk factors include greater psychosocial stress, level of baseline global functioning (including broad cognitive functioning, and intensity of negative symptoms.

==== Mechanisms of conversion ====
The mechanisms that underlie how different risk factors contribute to conversion in CHR remain unclear. Evidence from literature examining the etiology of schizophrenia and other chronic psychotic disorders has implicated disruptions in neuroinflammatory processes and brain function as potential significant mechanisms underpinning the development of psychosis. This is supported by research in CHR populations that reveals elevated peripheral levels of proinflammatory cytokines may predict conversion, as well as accelerated thinning of cortical grey matter and disrupted functional connectivity in brain networks (e.g., between the thalamus and cortex).

=== For non-converters ===
A large portion of those who meet criteria for CHR do not go on to transition to a chronic psychotic disorder. Outcomes for non-converters reflect the heterogeneity within the CHR population itself. Meta-analyses suggest that approximately half of non-converters will go on to experience remission from CHR symptoms, whereas others may continue to experience a consistent level or even worsening of psychotic symptoms. Even among individuals whose psychotic symptoms remit, this remission is not necessarily accompanied by improvements in cognitive or social functioning, and comorbidity with depression and anxiety often remains elevated. Evidence from meta-analyses suggest that CHR individuals with comorbid depressive disorders often experience greater deficits in social and role functioning. While comorbid depression often predicts worse functional outcomes, it has not been identified as a risk factor for conversion. Persistent negative symptoms are also associated with poorer outcomes in general functioning and overall quality of life for non-converters, even when controlling for persistent depressive symptoms.

== Treatment options ==
There are a variety of treatments that have been studied in CHR individuals, with the two most common types of interventions being psychosocial (i.e., psychotherapy) or pharmacological.

The most widely studied psychosocial treatment option is cognitive behavioral therapy (CBT), with evidence from several randomized controlled trials demonstrating that CBT may reduce the frequency and intensity of attenuated positive symptoms. However, meta-analyses do not support CBT being more effective in reducing transition risk compared to other interventions, and CBT was not associated with significant improvements in negative symptoms or social functioning. Other randomized controlled trials have been performed to explore the potential of other therapeutic modalities, including family focused therapy and integrative psychological therapy.

The use of antipsychotic medications in the CHR population has been controversial, particularly as there is mixed evidence for their efficacy. Randomized controlled trials of olanzapine, amisulpride, and ziprasidone suggest that although antipsychotics may be effective in improving attenuated psychotic symptoms, they do not necessarily reduce transition risk. Other pharmacological treatments that have been studied include omega-3 fatty acids and N-methyl-D-aspartate receptor (NMDAR) modulators, with mixed results across different studies in terms of their impact on reducing conversion risk. One randomized controlled trial of D-serine demonstrated that administration of D-serine was associated with improvement in negative symptoms, but further research into NMDAR modulators is needed.

Overall, meta-analyses suggest that there is not one particular treatment that is superior to the others in terms of reducing transition risk, attenuated psychotic symptoms, or negative symptoms, and CHR individuals may benefit from any kind of treatment.

== See also ==
- Early intervention in psychosis
- Schizophreniform disorder
- Schizothymia
- Schizotypal personality disorder
