= Mental health in Tajikistan =

Tajikistan's 1998 Mental Health Act encompasses the treatment of mental health problems in the country

Mental health in Tajikistan encompasses the prevalence, treatment, as well as social and economic effects of mental illness in Tajikistan.

== Epidemiology ==
=== Registration of mental health conditions ===
In 2005, the Tajik Ministry of Health reported that 41,177 individuals were registered for a mental health condition by the psychiatric services. Almost 50% of these individuals had an intellectual disability, while those with schizophrenia, schizotypal, and delusional disorders accounted for approximately 25% of these registrations.

=== Suicide ===
In 2019, the suicide mortality rate was 2.61 deaths by suicide per 100,000 people.

== Legislation ==
In 1998, the Mental Health Act replaced the Lunacy Act of 1996. The 1998 Mental Health Act introduced a framework for providing individuals with mental health problems with assistance, such as the provision of psychiatric medication free of charge to those with serious mental illnesses.

== Treatment ==
In 2020, there were 13 mental health treatment facilities. Furthermore, there were a total of 454 mental health professionals in the country, consisting of 187 psychiatrists, 261 mental health nurses, and 6 psychologists.

== Youth mental health ==
Among Tajikistanis aged between 12-24 in 2009-2010, the suicide rate per 100,000 was 11.7 for females and 10.6 for males. This higher prevalence of suicide among females is an anomaly in relation to the global trends on suicide patterns.
