= Coordinated Specialty Care =

Early psychosis intervention

Coordinated Specialty Care (CSC) is a recovery-oriented treatment program designed for people with first episode psychosis (FEP). CSC consists of collaborative treatment planning between the client and the client's care team, consisting of mental health clinicians, psychiatrists, and case managers. CSC includes individual and family therapy, medication management, psychoeducation and support, case management, and support surrounding education and employment goals. The program is considered an early psychosis intervention and is intended to be used shortly after symptoms onset.

== History ==
The first CSC's in the United States started in the early 2000s and did not expand nationally until after the Recovery After an Initial Schizophrenia Episode (RAISE) study, which was publicly funded by the National Institute of Mental Health. The goal of the initiative was to identify whether or not CSC's worked better than care typically available in community settings. Some examples of established CSC's include NAVIGATE, the Connection Program, OnTrackNY, Specialized Treatment Early in Psychosis (STEP), and Early Assessment and Support Alliance (EASA).

CSC programs provide six essential functions for younger individuals experiencing a first episode of psychosis. Ensuring that clients have access to clinicians that are trained in FEP is critical. Straightforward admission to the FEP treatment program through ongoing outreach and involvement makes it easier during the transition. During treatment care teams can also arrange to have in-home treatment and other community or clinical resources made available as needed. CSC program providers are profoundly attentive in the course of, and/or after a clinical crisis. The care teams and the client collaboratively plan for aftercare or stepping down to a lower level of care, and/or discharging from treatment is upon completion of treatment and the client demonstrates increased functional abilities.

== Components of Coordinated Specialty Care ==
Although individual programs have different approaches in their clinical model, there is a standard that must be followed in order to meet the criteria of a CSC. This includes psychopharmacological treatment, or medication management, psychotherapy, family education and support, supported employment and education, and case management.

=== Psychopharmacological Treatment ===
Psychopharmacological treatment, or medication management, is the process of assessing and prescribing medication for symptom management, and is a pivotal component of CSC. Long-term therapy with antipsychotics, however, is often associated with negative side-effects, low adherence, and high levels of medication discontinuation. Medication noncompliance is one of the many variables that lead to poorer outcomes among individuals with mental health issues and is even more so of an issue for individuals with schizophrenia, of which a third are noncompliant. Furthermore, studies have shown that medication alone is not enough, and is most successful in conjunction with psychosocial intervention: including psychoeducation, family interaction, skills training, and cognitive behavioral therapy. Medication management in CSC uses a shared-decision-making process combined with a harm reduction approach to encourage the individual to collaborate with their psychiatrist regardless of whether or not they choose to take medication.

=== Psychotherapy ===
Psychotherapy in a CSC is a cooperative and recovery-oriented process that aims to address various deficits that plague individuals with schizophrenia by focusing on attaining personal goals that lead to a meaningful life. NAVIGATE's Individual Resiliency Training Manual, for example, includes modules on goal setting, healthy lifestyles, wellness and relapse prevention, processing of the psychotic episode, strengths building, teaching coping skills for negative feelings, psychotic, non-psychotic and PTSD symptoms, as well as suicidal ideation and behavior, substance abuse, reintroduction to pleasant activities, and increasing social connections. Home practice is highly encouraged in CSC.

=== Family Education and Support ===
A critical component of CSC is the emphasis on the client's family and their home environment. Families that have a loved one experiencing first episode psychosis often display heightened levels of despair, distress, conflict, and anxiety. Most CSC clients request some form of family involvement. Family involvement is beneficial because it has been shown to help with relapse prevention, reduces hospitalizations, better treatment outcomes, greater employment outcomes, overall increase in quality of life, lower rates of substance abuse, and less deaths.

=== Supported Employment and Education (SEE) ===
FEP disrupts daily tasks and responsibilities such as school or work. It also can impact one's ability to get back to the routine and have stability as they once did. An SEE Specialist works with the client to figure out how they can offer support in working with clients on achieving vocational goals. Supported employment and education involves collaboratively figuring out personal preferences, employment history, training or credentials that the client has or may need. The client will receive the SEE services as a part of their clinical treatment goals.

Benefits of individuals getting support in employment and education can increase positive emotions surrounding self-worth and overall happiness. Additionally there is value and pleasure that comes from working and a decrease in depressive symptoms. These opportunities provide an increased chance to interact socially and possibly increase support systems and build a sense of community. Individuals can learn more about scheduling and time management which can increase levels of responsibility. Lastly, more school can make someone appear more marketable to become employed in areas that they desire to work in.

=== Case Management ===
==== Aftercare & Social Support ====
Part of the supported employment and education portions of treatment allow clients to potentially have a professional or educational opportunity set up for them upon completion of treatment. Additionally, a study was done about the association between perceived social support and recovery among patients with schizophrenia. Many believe that recovery from schizophrenia is unfeasible; the study's results found that there was “significant positive association between recovery and perceived social support; hence that patients who experience strong social support and higher levels of emotional and tangible support are more likely to experience satisfied levels of recovery.” Having support from family and friends for the duration and after the completion of treatment is a key factor in increasing the client's hope and positive outcomes in their recovery.

== Growth of the Paradigm in the US ==
Since the inception of CSC's, their numbers have slowly increased and due to their success in addressing the complex issues that are associated with psychosis. While not necessarily true for all programs, most CSC's are often referred to as “OnTrack” programs, or some variation of that, such as OnTrackSD in South Dakota, McLean OnTrack in Massachusetts, California OnTrack in California, and On Track TN in Tennessee, among others. Additional studies have been proposed to improve early psychosis interventions, utilizing the CSC model as the standard. The EPI-CAL program, led by investigators from the University of California, Davis, is an example of a study that hopes to expand early psychosis intervention throughout California, and increase consistency in training and implementation of evidence based practices.

== Current Programs ==
=== NAVIGATE ===
NAVIGATE was developed in response to the National Institute of Mental Health (NIMH), who asked that researchers develop and test interventions aimed to improve the course and outcomes of schizophrenia. The NAVIGATE team of clinicians was directed by Dr. John Kane at the Zucker Hillside Hospital in New York and was made up of professional connections from Dartmouth Medical School, University of North Carolina at Chapel Hill, Harvard Medical School, Yale Medical School, University of Calgary, UCLA, and SUNY Downstate Medical Center.

NAVIGATE is an extensive treatment program for those who have experienced a first episode of psychosis. Treatment is conducted by a CSC team, which encourages clients to work toward personal goals and recovery. NAVIGATE attempts to help clients achieve recovery from FEP by supporting overall functioning and engagement in their lives. Additionally, NAVIGATE utilizes medication management, individual resiliency training, family education, and supported employment and education to achieve treatment goals.

=== OnTrackNY ===
In June 2013, the New York State Department of Mental Hygiene introduced OnTrackNY to the public. OnTrackNY is a strategy to execute CSC programs in downstate New York. The OnTrackNY program was developed to help guide young adults understanding the meaning of their experiences and helps clients achieve personal goals. OnTrackNY offers skill building focused recovery review sessions, engagement in safety and overall wellness planning, and ensures that clients and their support system have access to services that they need. OnTrackNY is currently led by Professor Lisa Dixon of the Columbia University Irving Medical Center.
