= Early intervention in psychosis =

Early detection and treatment

Early intervention in psychosis is a clinical approach to those experiencing symptoms of psychosis for the first time. It forms part of a new prevention paradigm for psychiatry and is leading to reform of mental health services, especially in the United Kingdom and Australia.

This approach centers on the early detection and treatment of early symptoms of psychosis during the formative years of the psychotic condition. The first three to five years are believed by some to be a critical period. The aim is to reduce the usual delays to treatment for those in their first episode of psychosis. The provision of optimal treatments in these early years is thought to prevent relapses and reduce the long-term impact of the condition. It is considered a secondary prevention strategy.

The duration of untreated psychosis (DUP) has been shown as an indicator of prognosis, with a longer DUP associated with more long-term disability.

== Components of the model ==
There are a number of functional components of the early psychosis model, and they can be structured as different sub-teams within early psychosis services. The emerging pattern of sub-teams are currently:

=== Early psychosis treatment teams ===
Multidisciplinary clinical teams providing an intensive case management approach for the first three to five years. These early intervention teams are designed to serve 14-35 year olds in the early stages of schizophrenia. The approach is similar to assertive community treatment, but with an increased focus on the engagement and treatment of this previously untreated population and the provision of evidence based, optimal interventions for clients in their first episode of psychosis. For example, the use of low-dose antipsychotic medication is promoted ("start low, go slow"), with a need for monitoring of side effects and an intensive and deliberate period of psycho-education for patients and families that are new to the mental health system. In addition, research showed that family intervention for psychosis (FIp) reduced relapse rates, hospitalization duration, and psychotic symptoms along with increasing functionality in first-episode psychosis (FEP) up to 24 months. Interventions to prevent a further episodes of psychosis (a "relapse") and strategies that encourage a return to normal vocation and social activity are a priority. There is a concept of phase specific treatment for acute, early recovery and late recovery periods in the first episode of psychosis.

=== Early detection function ===
Interventions aimed at avoiding late detection and engagement of those in the course of their psychotic conditions. Key tasks include being aware of early signs of psychosis and improving pathways into treatment. Teams provide information and education to the general public and assist GPs with recognition and response to those with suspected signs, for example: EPPIC's Youth Access Team (YAT) (Melbourne); OPUS (Denmark); TIPS (Norway); REDIRECT (Birmingham); LEO CAT (London) "; STEP's Population Health approach to early detection.

The development and implementation of quantitative tools for early detection of at-risk individuals is an active research area. This includes development of risk calculators and methods for large-scale population screening.

=== Prodrome clinics ===
Prodrome or at risk mental state clinics are specialist services for those with subclinical symptoms of psychosis or other indicators of risk of transition to psychosis. The Pace Clinic in Melbourne, Australia, is considered one of the origins of this strategy, but a number of other services and research centers have since developed. These services are able to reliably identify those at high risk of developing psychosis and are beginning to publish encouraging outcomes from randomised controlled trials that reduce the chances of becoming psychotic, including evidence that psychological therapy and high doses of fish oil have a role in the prevention of psychosis. However, a meta-analysis of five trials found that while these interventions reduced risk of psychosis after 1 year (11% conversion to psychosis in intervention groups compared to 32% in control groups), these gains were not maintained over 2–3 years of follow-up. These findings indicate that interventions delay psychosis, but do not reduce the long-term risk. There has also been debate about the ethics of using antipsychotic medication to reduce the risk of developing psychosis, because of the potential harms involved with these medications.

In 2015, the European Psychiatric Association issued guidance recommending the use of the Cognitive Disturbances scale (COGDIS), a subscale of the basic symptoms scale, to assess psychosis risk; a meta-analysis conducted for the guidance found that while rates of conversion to psychosis were similar to those who meet Ultra High Risk (UHR) criteria up to 2 years after assessment, they were significantly higher after 2 years for those patients who met the COGDIS criteria. The COGDIS criteria measure subjective symptoms, and include such symptoms as thought interference, where irrelevant and emotionally unimportant thought contents interfere with the main line of thinking; thought block, where the current train of thought halts; thought pressure, where thoughts unrelated to a common topic appear uncontrollably; referential ideation that is immediately corrected; and other characteristic disturbances of attention and the use or understanding of language.

== History ==
Early intervention in psychosis is a preventive approach for psychosis that has evolved as contemporary recovery views of psychosis and schizophrenia have gained acceptance. It subscribes to a "post Kraepelin" concept of schizophrenia, challenging the assumptions originally promoted by Emil Kraepelin in the 19th century, that schizophrenia ("dementia praecox") was a condition with a progressing and deteriorating course. The work of Post, whose kindling model, together with Fava and Kellner, who first adapted staging models to mental health, provided an intellectual foundation. Psychosis is now formulated within a diathesis–stress model, allowing a more hopeful view of prognosis, and expects full recovery for those with early emerging psychotic symptoms. It is more aligned with psychosis as continuum (such as with the concept of schizotypy) with multiple contributing factors, rather than schizophrenia as simply a neurobiological disease.

Within this changing view of psychosis and schizophrenia, the model has developed from a divergence of several different ideas, and from a number of sites, beginning with the closure of psychiatric institutions signaling a move toward community based care. In 1986, the Northwick Park study discovered an association between delays to treatment and disability, questioning the service provision for those with their first episode of schizophrenia. In the 1990s, evidence began to emerge that cognitive behavioural therapy was an effective treatment for delusions and hallucinations. The next step came with the development of the EPPIC early detection service in Melbourne, Australia in 1996 and the prodrome clinic led by Alison Yung. This service was an inspiration to other services, such as the West Midlands IRIS group, including the carer charity Rethink Mental Illness; the TIPS early detection randomised control trial in Norway; and the Danish OPUS trial. In 2001, the United Kingdom Department of Health called the development of early psychosis teams "a priority". The International Early Psychosis Association, founded in 1998, issued an international consensus declaration together with the World Health Organization in 2004. Clinical practice guidelines have been written by consensus.

== Evidence ==
=== Clinical outcomes ===
There is evidence that providing access to specialized early intervention services results in benefits to patients during treatment. Such services lead to higher satisfaction among patients, and patients who have access to specialized early intervention services are more likely to stay in treatment, according to a 2020 Cochrane review. The same review also found that early intervention improved long-term global functioning outcomes; however, the evidence for this conclusion was of a lower quality, and all studies included in the review had been conducted in high-income countries, so it is not clear how these result will translate to lower-income countries. It is also unclear whether the benefits derived from early intervention persist once the patient is transferred to non-specialized treatment.

=== Cost-effectiveness ===
One argument in favor of creating early intervention services is that they not only improve clinical outcomes for individual patients, but also cost less than standard services to operate, for example by reducing in-patient costs. A systematic review conducted in 2019 concluded that there is evidence to support this claim; however, many of the available studies on the cost-effectiveness of these services have methodological flaws, and it is unclear whether their results will translate to lower-income countries. Another review conducted in 2020 likewise found low-certainty evidence that early intervention reduces the risk of subsequent in-patient hospitalization.

== Reform of mental health services ==
=== United Kingdom ===
The United Kingdom has made significant service reform with their adoption of early psychosis teams following the first service in Birmingham set up by Professor Max Birchwood in 1994 and used as a blueprint for national roll-out, with early psychosis now considered as an integral part of comprehensive community mental health services. The Mental Health Policy Implementation Guide outlines service specifications and forms the basis of a newly developed fidelity tool. There is a requirement for services to reduce the duration of untreated psychosis, as this has been shown to be associated with better long-term outcomes. The implementation guideline recommends:

- 14 to 35 year age entry criteria
- First three years of psychotic illness
- Aim to reduce the duration of untreated psychosis to less than 3 months
- Maximum caseload ratio of 1 care coordinator to 10–15 clients
- For every 250,000 (depending on population characteristics), one team
  - Total caseload 120 to 150
  - 1.5 doctors per team
  - Other specialist staff to provide specific evidence based interventions

=== Australia and New Zealand ===
In Australia the EPPIC initiative provides early intervention services. In the Australian government's 2011 budget, $222.4 million was provided to fund 12 new EPPIC centres in collaboration with the states and territories. However, there have been criticisms of the evidence base for this expansion and of the claimed cost savings.

On August 19, 2011, Patrick McGorry, South Australian Social Inclusion Commissioner David Cappo AO and Frank Quinlan, CEO of the Mental Health Council of Australia, addressed a meeting of the Council of Australian Governments (COAG), chaired by Prime Minister Julia Gillard, on the future direction of mental health policy and the need for priority funding for early intervention. The invitation, an initiative of South Australian Premier Mike Rann, followed the release of Cappo's "Stepping Up" report, supported by the Rann Government, which recommended a major overhaul of mental health in South Australia, including stepped levels of care and early intervention.

New Zealand has operated significant early psychosis teams for more than 20 years, following the inclusion of early psychosis in a mental health policy document in 1997. There is a national early psychosis professional group, New Zealand Early Intervention for Psychosis Society (NZEIPS), organising a biannual training event, advocating for evidenced based service reform and supporting production of local resources.

=== Scandinavia ===
Early psychosis programmes have continued to develop from the original TIPS services in Norway.

In Denmark, an early intervention programme called OPUS was introduced as a randomized trial between 1998 and 2000. The trial was considered successful and OPUS was subsequently made the standard treatment programme for people aged 18–35. Later analysis of the effects of the programme conducted in 2021 showed that it had not only maintained its effects from the first trial, but that it had in fact been even more effective following its nationwide adoption as the standard treatment.

=== North America ===
Canada has extensive coverage across most provinces, including established clinical services and comprehensive academic research in British Columbia (Vancouver), Alberta (EPT in Calgary), Quebec (PEPP-Montreal), and Ontario (PEPP, FEPP).

In the United States, the Early Assessment Support Alliance (EASA) is implementing early psychosis intervention throughout the state of Oregon.

In the United States, the implementation of coordinated specialty care (CSC), as a recovery-oriented treatment program for people with first episode psychosis (FEP), has become a US health policy priority. CSC promotes shared decision making and uses a team of specialists who work with the client to create a personal treatment plan. The specialists offer psychotherapy, medication management geared to individuals with FEP, family education and support, case management, and work or education support, depending on the individual's needs and preferences. The client and the team work together to make treatment decisions, involving family members as much as possible. The goal is to link the individual with a CSC team as soon as possible after psychotic symptoms begin because a longer period of unchecked and untreated illness might be associated with poorer outcomes.

=== Asia ===
The first meeting of the Asian Network of Early Psychosis (ANEP) was held in 2004. There are now established services in Singapore, Hong Kong and South Korea

== See also ==
- Pediatric schizophrenia
- Schizophrenia
- Recovery model
- Deinstitutionalisation
