= Schizotypal personality disorder =

Mental disorder involving eccentricity and social isolation in afflicted individuals

- Other names: Schizotypal disorder
- Specialty: Psychiatry, clinical psychology
- Symptoms: Ideas of reference, unusual beliefs, perceptual illusions, odd thinking and speech, paranoia, inappropriate affect, strange behavior, social anxiety, dissociation
- Complications: Schizophrenia, substance use disorder, major depressive disorder, schizoid personality disorder
- Usual onset: 10–20 years old
- Duration: Chronic
- Causes: Genetics; childhood neglect; childhood abuse
- Risk factors: Family history
- Diagnostic method: Based on symptoms
- Differential diagnosis: Other cluster A personality disorders, borderline personality disorder, avoidant personality disorder, autism spectrum disorder (ASD), social anxiety disorder, attention deficit hyperactivity disorder, dissociative identity disorder
- Treatment: Cognitive behavioral therapy, metacognitive therapy, cognitive remediation therapy
- Medication: Antipsychotics, antidepressants
- Prognosis: Typically poor, although significant improvements can be made
- Frequency: Estimated 3% of general population

Schizotypal personality disorder (StPD or SPD), also known as schizotypal disorder, is a mental disorder characterized by thought disorder, paranoia, a characteristic form of social anxiety, derealization, transient psychosis, and unconventional beliefs. People with this disorder often feel pronounced discomfort in forming and maintaining social connections with other people, primarily due to the belief that other people harbor negative thoughts and views about them. People with StPD may react oddly in conversations, such as not responding as expected, or talking to themselves. They frequently interpret situations as being strange or having unusual meanings for them; paranormal and superstitious beliefs are common. Those with the disorder often score high on measures for self-disorder.

The Diagnostic and Statistical Manual of Mental Disorders, Fifth Edition (DSM-5) classifies StPD as a personality disorder belonging to cluster A, which is a grouping of personality disorders exhibiting traits such as odd and eccentric behavior. In the International Classification of Diseases, the latest edition of which is the ICD-11, schizotypal disorder is not classified as a personality disorder, but among psychotic disorders.

People with StPD usually disagree with the suggestion that their thoughts and behaviors are a disorder and seek medical attention for depression or anxiety instead. Schizotypal personality disorder occurs in approximately 3% of the general population and is more commonly diagnosed in males.

== Signs and symptoms ==
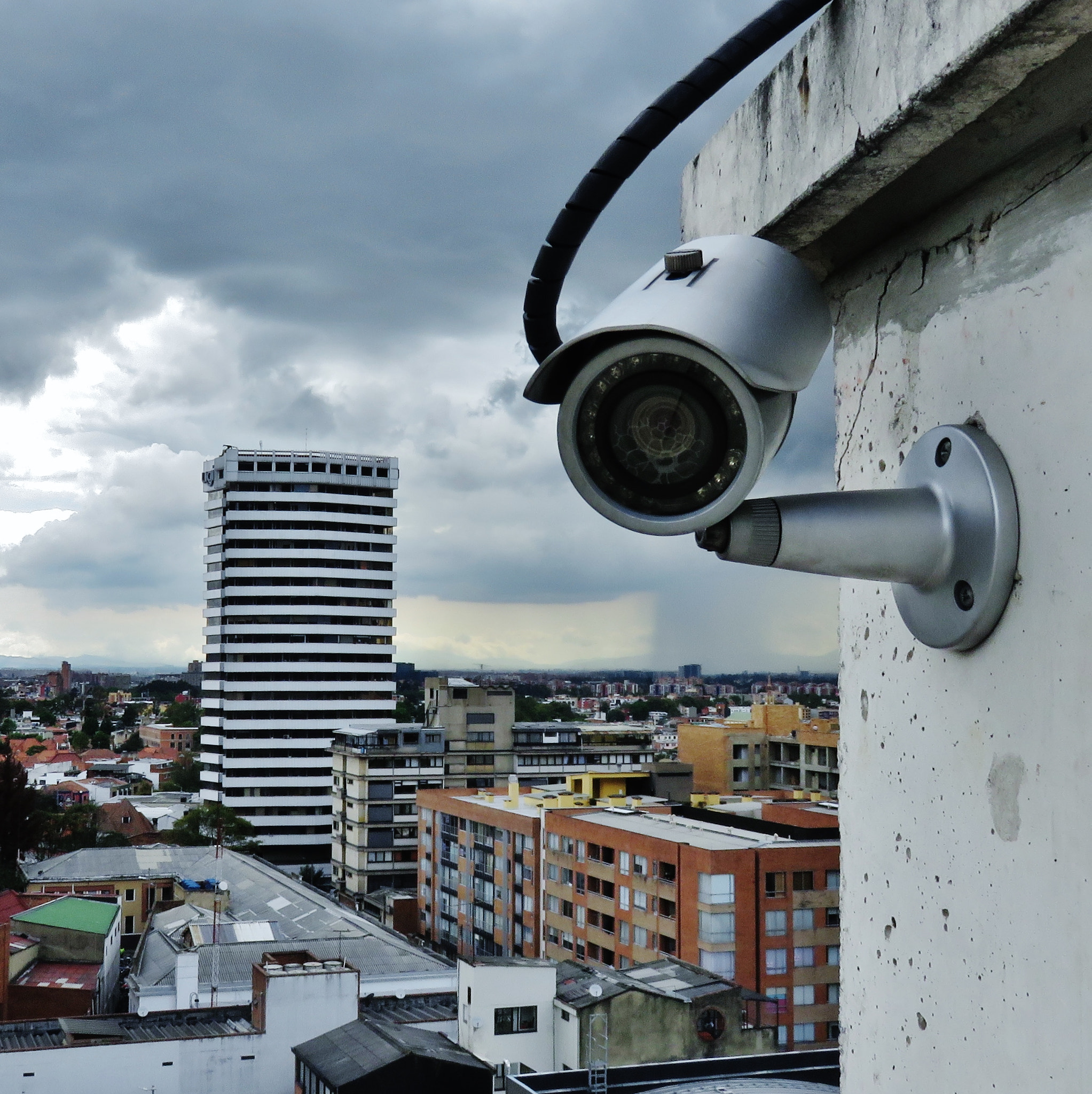
People with StPD can feel intense paranoia.

People with StPD can have abnormal sensory experiences (similar to the one pictured) in places or situations where others experience nothing unusual.

=== Magical thinking ===
Odd and magical thinking is common among people with StPD. They are more likely to believe in supernatural phenomena and entities. It is common for people with StPD to experience severe social anxiety and have paranoid ideation. Ideas of reference are common in people with StPD. They can feel as if expressing themselves is dangerous. They may also feel that others are more competent, and have deeply entrenched and pervasive insecurities. Strange thinking patterns may be a defense mechanism against these feelings. People with StPD usually have limited levels of self-awareness. They may believe others think of them more negatively than they actually do.

=== Affect ===
Patients with StPD can have difficulties in recognizing their or others' emotions, which can extend to difficulty expressing emotion. They may have limited responses to others' emotions and can be ambivalent. It is common for people with StPD to derive limited joy from activities. People with StPD are typically more socially isolated and uninterested in social situations than people without StPD, although they are still likely to be socially active on the Internet. Depersonalization, derealization, boredom, and internal fantasies are common in patients with StPD. Abnormal facial expressions are also common in people with StPD, and they can have aberrant eye movements and difficulty responding to stimuli. They are often more prone to substance abuse or suicidal ideation. In an epidemiological study on suicidal behavior in StPD, even when sociodemographic factors were accounted for, people with StPD were 1.51 times more likely to attempt suicide. StPD is also often characterized as having similar symptoms as schizophrenia, but with less severe cognitive deficits.

=== Cognition ===
People with StPD tend to have cognitive impairments. They can have abnormal perceptional and sensory experiences such as illusions. For example, someone with StPD may perceive colors as lighter or darker than others perceive them. Facial perception may also be difficult for people with the disorder. They may see others as deformed, misrecognize them, or feel as if they are alien to them. People with StPD can have difficulty processing information such as speech or language. They are more likely to speak slowly, with less fluctuation in pitch, and long pauses between speech. Patients with StPD may have a lower odor detection threshold, and can have impaired auditory or olfactory processing. It is also common for people with StPD to struggle with context processing, which cause them to form loose connections between events. In addition, people with StPD can have decreased capacities for multisensory integration or contrast sensitivity, either hyperreactive or impaired reactions to sensory input, slower response times, impaired attention, poorer postural control, and difficulties with decision-making. They can have difficulties in memory, and may have frequent intrusive memories of events. It is common for people with StPD to feel déjà vu or as if they can accurately predict future events due to abnormalities in the brain's memory storage.

== Causes ==
=== Genetic ===
Although environmental factors likely play an important role in the onset of the disorder, people who have relatives with schizotypy, mood disorders, or other disorders on the schizophrenia spectrum are at a higher likelihood of developing StPD.

The COMT Val158Met polymorphism and its Val or Met alleles are suspected to be associated with schizotypal personality disorder. These genes affect dopamine production in the brain, a neurochemical thought to be associated with schizotypal traits. The gene may also contribute to decreased volumes of gray matter in the prefrontal cortex. This may lead to impaired capacities for decision-making, speech, cognitive flexibility, and altered perceptual experiences.

The rs1006737 polymorphism of the CACNA1C gene is also believed to have a part in schizotypal symptoms. It may lead to a significantly increased physiological response to stress through the cortisol awakening response in the brain. It may also negatively affect reward processing in the brain and lead to anhedonia or depression in patients. These factors possibly lead to the development of schizotypal traits.

The zinc finger protein 804A likely affects the levels of paranoia, anxiety, and ideas of reference in StPD. This gene is also thought to negatively impact attention in people with StPD. It may lead to an increased level of white matter volume in the frontal lobe.

Another gene, Notch 4, is thought to relate to schizophrenia spectrum disorders. It can lead to disruptions in the occipital cortex, and, therefore, to symptoms of schizotypy. The GLRA1 and the p250GAP genes are also potentially associated with StPD. It may lead to abnormally low levels of glutamic acids in NMDA receptors, which impairs memory and learning. StPD may stem from abnormalities in chromosome 22.

=== Neurological ===
Exposure to influenza during week 23 of gestation is associated with a higher likelihood of developing StPD. Poor nutrition in childhood may also contribute to the onset of StPD by altering the course of brain development.

Numerous areas of the brain are thought to be associated with StPD. Higher levels of dopamine in the brain, possibly specifically the dopamine D_{1} receptor, might contribute to the development of StPD. StPD is associated with heightened dopaminergic activity in the striatum. Their symptoms may also stem from higher presynaptic dopamine release.

People with StPD may also have decreased volumes of grey or white matter in their caudate nucleus, which leads to difficulties in speech.

People with StPD likely have a reduced volume in their temporal lobes, possibly specifically the left hemisphere. The reduced levels of grey matter in these areas may be linked to their negative symptoms. Reduced volume of gray or white matter in the superior temporal gyrus or the transverse temporal gyrus are thought to lead to issues with speech, memory, and hallucinations. Deficits in the gray matter volume of the temporal lobe and prefrontal cortex are likely associated with impairments in cognitive function, sensory processing, speech, executive function, decision-making, and emotional processing present in people with StPD.

StPD symptoms may also be influenced by reduced internal capsule, which carries information to the cerebral cortex. People with StPD can also have impairments in the uncinate fasciculus, which connects parts of the limbic system. People with StPD have reduced levels of gray matter in their middle frontal gyrus and Brodmann area 10, although not as reduced as patients with schizophrenia, possibly preventing them from developing schizophrenia. Increased gyrification in gyri by the cerebellum may lead to dysconnectivity in the brain, and therefore, schizotypal symptoms.

Individuals with the disorder may also have a hyporeactive or hyperreactive amygdala, as well as hyperactive pituitary glands and putamens.

It is also possible that lower capacities for prepulse inhibition play a role in StPD. Research has suggested that people with StPD can have higher concentrations of homovanillic acids. Abnormalities in the cave of septum pellucidum may also be present.

In people predisposed to schizophrenia spectrum disorders, the consumption of cannabis can induce the onset of StPD or other disorders with psychotic symptoms.

=== Environmental ===
Unique environmental factors, which differ from shared sibling experiences, have been found to play a role in the development of StPD and its dimensions. There is evidence to suggest that parenting styles, early separation, childhood trauma, and childhood neglect can lead to the development of schizotypal traits. Neglect, abuse, stress, trauma, or family dysfunction during childhood may increase the risk of developing schizotypal personality disorder. People with the most severe cases of StPD usually have a combination of childhood trauma and a genetic basis for their condition.

During childhood, people with StPD may have seen little emotional expression from their parents. Another possibility is that they were excessively criticized or felt like they were constantly under threat, potentially resulting in the onset of social anxiety, strange thinking patterns, and blunted affect present in StPD.

Over time, children learn to interpret social cues and respond appropriately, but for unknown reasons, this process does not work well for people with this disorder. Their difficulties in social situations might eventually cause the individual to withdraw from most social interactions, thus leading to asociality. Children with schizotypal symptoms usually are more likely to indulge in internal fantasies and are more anxious, socially isolated, and sensitive to criticism.

There is also evidence indicating that disruptions in brain development during the prenatal period could affect the development of StPD.

== Diagnosis ==
=== Classification ===
The two most prominent frameworks for classification of mental disorders are the Diagnostic and Statistical Manual of Mental Disorders (DSM) and the International Classification of Diseases (ICD). While classified as a personality disorder in the DSM-5; under the name schizotypal disorder, it is classified among schizophrenia spectrum disorders in the ICD-11 and previous revisions of the ICD. Approaches to classification of personality disorders vary.

==== DSM-5 ====
The DSM-5 includes two distinct diagnostic models for personality disorder (PD). The DSM-5’s main body (Section II) retains a traditional, categorical model of 10 putatively distinct PDs, whereas its Section III (Emerging Models and Methods) introduces an alternative, dimensional model for PD – namely, the Alternative DSM-5 Model for Personality Disorders (AMPD) – consisting of two main criteria—personality functioning and personality traits—both of which range from the adaptive to the maladaptive range.

In its section II chapter on personality disorders, the latest edition of the DSM – namely the DSM-5-TR – defines STPD as "a pattern of acute discomfort in close relationships, cognitive or perceptual distortions, and eccentricities of behavior". Retained from the DSM-IV-TR, the criteria require that at least five out of nine diagnostic criteria are met. In addition to the aforementioned criteria, a diagnosis requires that the condition is not merely a part of the manifestation of a disorder causing psychosis, such as schizophrenia, nor of autism spectrum disorder.

The AMPD defines six specific personality disorders – one of them being STPD – in terms of a description of the disorder; the characteristic manner in which the disorder impacts personality functioning, i.e. identity, self-direction, empathy and intimacy (criterion A); as well as a listing and description of the pathological personality traits associated with the disorder (criterion B). While at least two of the elements of personality functioning must have a "moderate or greater impairment", criterion B for Schizotypal PD requires four or more of six trait facets: Cognitive and Perceptual Dysregulation, Unusual beliefs and Experiences, Eccentric Perceptions (all three of which are facets of the Psychoticism domain), Restricted Affectivity, Withdrawal, and Suspiciousness. Other traits can be included in the diagnosis as specifiers. Five additional criteria (C through G) further define the two main criteria.

==== ICD ====
Neither the ICD-10 nor the ICD-11 conceptualize StPD as being a personality disorder. Instead, it is listed together with psychotic disorders as "Schizotypal disorder" in the ICD-11 (as 6A22) and the ICD-10 (as F21). In regards to personality disorders, the ICD-11 classification of personality disorders has replaced the categorical classification of personality disorders in the ICD-10 with a dimensional model containing a unified personality disorder (6D10) with severity specifiers, along with specifiers for prominent personality traits or patterns (6D11). While there is no specific PD diagnosis for StPD, schizotypal features – such as eccentricity and psychotic-like experiences – are considered indicators of severity, especially in severe cases involving impaired reality testing. These features are not coded as traits but inform the overall level of dysfunction.

=== Differential diagnosis ===
Other mental disorders with psychotic symptoms should be considered. Unlike delusional disorder, schizophrenia, or mood disorders with psychotic features, StPD is not characterized by a persistent period of psychotic symptoms. StPD symptoms must also persist when psychotic symptoms are not present.

It should also be differentiated from other personality disorders; they can have symptoms similar to StPD. People with schizotypal personality disorder, paranoid personality disorder and schizoid personality disorder can also be socially detached and have blunted affects, but without the cognitive or perceptual distortions of StPD. Individuals with StPD and people with avoidant personality disorder can have limited close relationships. However, people with AvPD rarely have the eccentric behaviour of StPD. Psychotic-like symptoms can also appear in borderline personality disorder, but those with BPD fear social isolation while those with StPD are comfortable with it. People with StPD are also usually less impulsive than people with BPD. Individuals with narcissistic personality disorder may also appear socially alienated, however, this is due to fears of having flaws noticed by others.

Another differential diagnosis is personality change due to another medical condition; symptoms similar to those of StPD can appear due to other medical conditions that affect the central nervous system or substance use disorders. Consideration should also be given to autism spectrum disorder and communication disorders.

=== Screening ===
There are various methods of screening for schizotypal personality. The Schizotypal Personality Questionnaire (SPQ) measures nine traits of StPD using a self-report assessment. The nine traits referenced are Ideas of Reference, Excessive Social Anxiety, Odd Beliefs or Magical Thinking, Unusual Perceptual Experiences, Odd or Eccentric Behavior, No Close Friends, Odd Speech, Constricted Affect, and Suspiciousness. A study found that of the participants who scored in the top 10th percentile of all the SPQ scores, 55% were clinically diagnosed with StPD. It has been adapted into a computerized adaptive version, known as the SPQ-CAT. A method that measures the risk of developing psychosis through self-reports is the Wisconsin Schizotypy Scale (WSS). The WSS divides schizotypal personality traits into 4 scales for Perceptual Aberration, Magical Ideation, Revised Social Anhedonia, and Physical Anhedonia. A comparison of the SPQ and the WSS suggests that these measures should be cautiously used for screening of StPD.

When screening for StPD, it is difficult to distinguish between schizotypal personality disorder and autism spectrum disorder. In order to develop better screening tools, researchers are looking into the importance of ipseity disturbance, which is characteristic of schizophrenia spectrum disorders such as StPD but not of autism.

=== Millon's subtypes ===
Theodore Millon proposes two subtypes of schizotypal personality. Any individual with schizotypal personality disorder may exhibit either one of the following somewhat different subtypes (note that Millon believes it is rare for a personality to show one pure variant, but rather a mixture of one major variant with one or more secondary variants):

Subtype	Features	Traits
Insipid schizotypal	A structural exaggeration of the passive-detached pattern. It includes schizoid, depressive and dependent features.	Sense of strangeness and nonbeing; overtly drab, sluggish, inexpressive; internally bland, barren, indifferent, and insensitive; obscured, vague, and tangential thoughts.
Timorous schizotypal	A structural exaggeration of the active-detached pattern. It includes avoidant and negativistic features.	Warily apprehensive, watchful, suspicious, guarded, shrinking, deadens excess sensitivity; alienated from self and others; intentionally blocks, reverses, or disqualifies own thoughts.

Millon's typology of personality disorders was influential in the development of the DSM-III, particularly with respect to distinguishing between schizoid, schizotypal and avoidant personality disorders. These had previously been considered different surface-level expressions of the same underlying personality structure, and some psychologists, particularly those working in psychoanalytic or psychodynamic traditions, still take these personality disorders to be essentially similar.

== Treatment ==
=== Medication ===
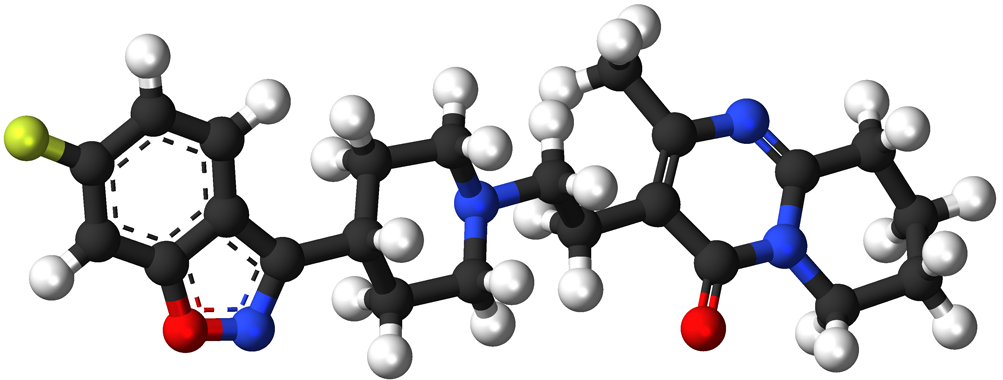
Ball-and-stick model of Risperidone, a drug used to treat StPD

Model of Cognitive behavioral therapy, a type of therapy used to treat StPD

StPD is rarely seen as the primary reason for treatment in a clinical setting, but it often occurs as a comorbid finding with other mental disorders. When patients with StPD have prescribed pharmaceuticals, they are usually prescribed antipsychotics. However, the use of neuroleptic drugs in the schizotypal population is in great doubt. The antipsychotics which show promise as treatments for StPD include olanzapine, risperidone, haloperidol, and thiothixene. The antidepressant fluoxetine may also be helpful. While people with schizotypal personality disorder and other attenuated psychotic-spectrum disorders may have a good outcome with neuroleptics in the short term, long-term follow-up suggests significant impairment in daily functioning compared to schizotypal and even schizophrenic people without antipsychotic drug exposure. Positive, negative, and depressive symptoms were shown to be improved by the use of olanzapine, an antipsychotic. Those with comorbid OCD and StPD were most positively affected by the use of olanzapine and showed worse outcomes with the use of clomipramine, an antidepressant. Antidepressants are also sometimes prescribed, whether for StPD proper or for comorbid anxiety and depression. However, there is some ambiguity in the efficacy of antidepressants, as many studies have only tested people with StPD and comorbid obsessive–compulsive disorder or borderline personality disorder. They have shown little efficacy for treating dysthymia and anhedonia related to StPD. Both of these medications are the most frequently prescribed medication for StPD, though the use and efficacy of them should be evaluated differently for every case. The use of stimulants has also shown some efficacy, especially for those with worsened cognitive and attentional issues. Patients who have concurrent psychosis should be monitored more closely if stimulants are used as part of their treatment. Other drugs which may be effective include pergolide, guanfacine, and dihydrexidine.

=== Psychotherapy ===
According to Theodore Millon, schizotypal personality disorder is one of the most straightforward personality disorders to identify but one of the most difficult to treat with psychotherapy. Cognitive remediation therapy, metacognitive therapy, supportive psychotherapy, social skills training, evolutionary systems therapy and cognitive-behavioral therapy can be effective treatments for the disorder. Notably, two recent meta-analyses suggest that evolutionary systems therapy is a promising treatment—representing the only exclusively psychosocial approach tested—although still characterized by limited sample sizes. Increased social interaction with others may be able to help limit symptoms of StPD. Support is crucial for schizotypal patients with predominant paranoid symptoms because they may have difficulties even in highly structured groups. Persons with StPD usually consider themselves to be simply eccentric or nonconformist; the degree to which they consider their social nonconformity a problem differs from the degree to which it is viewed as a problem in psychiatry. It is difficult to gain rapport with people with StPD because increasing familiarity and intimacy often increase their level of anxiety and discomfort. Therapy for StPD must be flexible to face emergencies or unique challenges.

== Prognosis ==
People with StPD usually had symptoms of schizotypal personality disorder in childhood. Traits of StPD usually remain consistently present over time, although can fluctuate greatly in severity and stability. The two traits of StPD which are least likely to change are paranoia and abnormal experiences. DSM characterizes StPD as having nine major symptoms: ideas of reference, odd/magical beliefs, social anxiety, not having close friends, odd or eccentric behavior, odd speech, unusual perceptions, suspiciousness, schizo-obsessive behaviors and constricted affect.

There may be gender differences in the symptomology of men and women with StPD. Women with the disorder might be more likely to have less severe cognitive deficits, and more severe social anxiety and magical thinking. Symptoms of depression in women with StPD have a more negative impact on cognitive functioning than in males diagnosed with StPD and depression. In males with the disorder, abstraction and verbal learning are more likely to be in deficit compared to women, who tend to be less vulnerable to verbal deficits. Despite the knowledge that LGBTQ+ people face barriers in accessing care, and that gender and sexual minorities are at higher risk of mental illness in general partially due to this and also due to societal discrimination, little research has been done on how StPD affects them differently in comparison to cisgender and heterosexual people.

StPD tends to develop in adolescence and early adulthood, accompanied by a gradual decline in functioning and the increased development of StPD symptoms. Adolescents with StPD were more likely to have performance deficits, especially in arithmetic, and to display significantly lower levels of executive functioning, similar to autism spectrum disorder. Compared to those without StPD, adolescents with StPD spend more time socializing on the Internet, such as on forums, chat rooms and cooperative computer games, and spend less time socializing in-person. People with StPD are more likely to only have a high school education, to be unemployed, and to have significant functional impairment.

Roughly 20-30% of those diagnosed with StPD will later develop schizophrenia. One study found that substance use is a risk factor. The same study found that older age presented a reduced risk, and that preexisting anxiety and depression disorders had protective effects.

== Epidemiology ==
The reported prevalence of StPD in community studies ranges from 1.37% in a Norwegian sample, to 4.6% in an American sample. A large American study found a lifetime prevalence of 3.9%, with somewhat higher rates among men (4.2%) than women (3.7%). It may be uncommon in clinical populations, with reported rates of up to 1.9%. It has been estimated to be prevalent among up to 5.2% of the general population. Together with other cluster A personality disorders, it is also very common among homeless people who show up at drop-in centers, according to a 2008 New York study. The study did not address homeless people who do not show up at drop-in centers. Schizotypal disorder may be overdiagnosed in Russia and other post-Soviet states.

Schizotypal can be diagnosed in early childhood, with diagnostic validity beginning at age five. Though the prevalence is not yet established, one study found a prevalence of definite psychotic symptoms in children of 5.9% and 10.2%.

=== Common comorbidities ===
StPD can be diagnosed alongside other disorders, including borderline personality disorder (BPD), attention-deficit disorder, social anxiety disorder, and autism spectrum disorder. Comorbidities such as these can influence and potentially interfere with an individual's diagnosis of StPD. People who are treatment-resistant to obsessive–compulsive disorder (OCD) behavioral therapy and medication that also display odd or eccentric behaviors could contribute to the coexistence of obsessive–compulsive disorder with schizotypal disorder. In the case that StPD precedes a diagnosis of schizophrenia, the StPD diagnosis is maintained but marked as premorbid. Common comorbidities include the following:

- Antisocial personality disorder
- Avoidant personality disorder
- Bipolar disorder
- Borderline personality disorder
- Dysthymia
- Narcissistic personality disorder
- Obsessive–compulsive disorder
- Major depressive disorder
- Paranoid personality disorder
- Post-traumatic stress disorder
- Schizoid personality disorder
- Schizophrenia
- Substance use disorders
- Social anxiety disorder
- Dissociative identity disorder

== History ==
StPD was introduced in 1980 in the DSM-III. Its inclusion provided a new classification for schizophrenia-spectrum disorders and of personality disorders that were previously unspecified. Its diagnosis was developed through differentiating the classifications of borderline personality disorder, of which some of the diagnosed population demonstrated schizophrenia-spectrum traits. When the separation of borderline personality disorder and StPD was originally suggested by Spitzer and Endicott, Siever and Gunderson opposed the distinction. Siever and Gunderson's opposition to Spitzer and Endicott was that StPD was related to schizophrenia. Spitzer and Endicott stated "We believe, as do the authors, that the evidence for the genetic relationship between Schizotypal features and Chronic Schizophrenia is suggestive rather than proven". StPD was included in the DSM-IV and the DSM-5 and saw little change in its diagnosis.

== See also ==
- Boundaries of the mind
- Schizophrenia
- Schizothymia
- Schizotypy
- Dissociative identity disorder
