= Schizothymia =

Temperament related to schizophrenia

Schizothymia is a temperament related to schizophrenia in a way analogous to cyclothymia's relationship with bipolar disorder. Schizothymia was proposed by German psychiatrist Ernst Kretschmer in the early 20th century when examining body types of schizophrenic patients. Schizothymia is defined by reduced affect display, a high degree of introversion, limited social cognition, and withdrawing from social relations generally. Nevertheless, individuals with such personality traits may achieve relatively affable social relations and a measure of affectivity situationally. As a kind of temperament, schizothymic personality traits are thought to be innate rather than the result of socialization or a lack thereof (Nature versus Nurture).

== See also ==
- Psychoticism
- Schizophrenia
- Schizoid personality disorder
- Schizotypal personality disorder
- Schizoaffective disorder
- Schizophreniform disorder
- Schizotypy
