= Spectrum disorder =

Mental disorder that encompasses a range of similar conditions

A spectrum disorder is, in psychiatry, a disorder that includes a range of linked conditions, sometimes also extending to include singular symptoms and traits. The different elements of a spectrum either have a similar appearance or are thought to be caused by the same underlying mechanism. In either case, a spectrum approach is taken because there appears to be "not a unitary disorder but rather a syndrome composed of subgroups". The spectrum may represent a range of severity, comprising relatively "severe" mental disorders through to relatively "mild and nonclinical deficits". The term "spectrum disorder" is heavily used in psychiatry and psychology, but has also seen adoption in other areas of medicine, for example hypermobility spectrum disorder and neuromyelitis optica spectrum disorder.

In some cases, a spectrum approach joins conditions that were previously considered separately. A notable example of this trend is the autism spectrum, where conditions on this spectrum may now all be referred to as autism spectrum disorders, and in the DSM-5 were unified into a single autism spectrum disorder (ASD). A spectrum approach may also expand the type or the severity of issues which are included, which may lessen the gap with other diagnoses or with what is considered "normal". Proponents of this approach argue that it is in line with evidence of gradations in the type or severity of symptoms in the general population.

== Origin ==
The visible color spectrum

The term spectrum was originally used in physics to indicate an apparent qualitative distinction arising from a quantitative continuum (i.e. a series of distinct colors experienced when a beam of white light is dispersed by a prism according to wavelength). Isaac Newton first used the word spectrum (Latin for "appearance" or "apparition") in print in 1671, in describing his experiments in optics.

The term was first used by analogy in psychiatry with a slightly different connotation, to identify a group of conditions that is qualitatively distinct in appearance but believed to be related from an underlying pathogenic point of view. It has been noted that for clinicians trained after the publication of DSM-III (1980), the spectrum concept in psychiatry may be relatively new, but that it has a long and distinguished history that dates back to Emil Kraepelin and beyond. A dimensional concept was proposed by Ernst Kretschmer in 1921 for schizophrenia (schizothymic – schizoid – schizophrenic) and for affective disorders (cyclothymic temperament – cycloid 'psychopathy' – manic-depressive disorder), as well as by Eugen Bleuler in 1922. The term "spectrum" was first used in psychiatry in 1968 in regard to a postulated schizophrenia spectrum, at that time meaning a linking together of what were then called "schizoid personalities", in people diagnosed with schizophrenia and their genetic relatives (see Seymour S. Kety).

For different investigators, the hypothetical common disease-causing link has been of a different nature.

== Related concepts ==
A spectrum approach generally overlays or extends a categorical approach, which today is most associated with the Diagnostic and Statistical Manual of Mental Disorders (DSM) and International Statistical Classification of Diseases (ICD). In these diagnostic guides, disorders are considered present if there is a certain combination and number of symptoms. Gradations of present versus absent are not allowed, although there may be subtypes of severity within a category. The categories are also polythetic, because a constellation of symptoms is laid out and different patterns of them can qualify for the same diagnosis. These categories are important aids for our practical purposes such as providing specific labels to facilitate payments for mental health professionals. They have been described as clearly worded, with observable criteria, and therefore an advance over some previous models for research purposes.

A spectrum approach sometimes starts with the nuclear, classic DSM diagnostic criteria for a disorder (or may join several disorders), and then include an additional broad range of issues such as temperaments or traits, lifestyle, behavioral patterns, and personality characteristics.

In addition, the term 'spectrum' may be used interchangeably with continuum, although the latter goes further in suggesting a direct straight line with no significant discontinuities. Under some continuum models, there are no set types or categories at all, only different dimensions along which everyone varies (hence a dimensional approach).

An example can be found in personality or temperament models. For example, a model that was derived from linguistic expressions of individual differences is subdivided into the Big Five personality traits, where everyone can be assigned a score along each of the five dimensions. This is by contrast to models of 'personality types' or temperament, where some have a certain type and some do not. Similarly, in the classification of mental disorders, a dimensional approach, which is being considered for the DSM-V, would involve everyone having a score on personality trait measures. A categorical approach would only look for the presence or absence of certain clusters of symptoms, perhaps with some cut-off points for severity for some symptoms only, and as a result diagnose some people with personality disorders.

A spectrum approach, by comparison, suggests that although there is a common underlying link, which could be continuous, particular sets of individuals present with particular patterns of symptoms (i.e. syndrome or subtype), reminiscent of the visible spectrum of distinct colors after refraction of light by a prism.

It has been argued that within the data used to develop the DSM system there is a large literature leading to the conclusion that a spectrum classification provides a better perspective on phenomenology (appearance and experience) of psychopathology (mental difficulties) than a categorical classification system. However, the term has a varied history, meaning one thing when referring to a schizophrenia spectrum and another when referring to bipolar or obsessive–compulsive disorder spectrum, for example.

== Types of spectrum ==
The widely used DSM and ICD manuals are generally limited to categorical diagnoses. However, some categories include a range of subtypes which vary from the main diagnosis in clinical presentation or typical severity. Some categories could be considered subsyndromal (not meeting criteria for the full diagnosis) subtypes. In addition, many of the categories include a 'not otherwise specified' subtype, where enough symptoms are present but not in the main recognized pattern; in some categories this is the most common diagnosis.

The DSM-5 only formally recognises the "autism spectrum" and the "schizophrenia spectrum", but many other spectrum concepts have been proposed in research, and are sometimes used in clinical practice, including the following.

=== Anxiety, stress, and dissociation ===
Several types of spectrum are in use in these areas, some of which are being considered in the DSM-5.

A generalized anxiety spectrum – this spectrum has been defined by duration of symptoms: a type lasting over six months (a DSM-IV criterion), over one month (DSM-III), or lasting two weeks or less (though may recur), and also isolated anxiety symptoms not meeting criteria for any type.

A social anxiety spectrum – this has been defined to span shyness to social anxiety disorder, including typical and atypical presentations, isolated signs and symptoms, and elements of avoidant personality disorder.

A panic-agoraphobia spectrum – due to the heterogeneity (diversity) found in individual clinical presentations of panic disorder and agoraphobia, attempts have been made to identify symptom clusters in addition to those included in the DSM diagnoses, including through the development of a dimensional questionnaire measure.

A post-traumatic stress spectrum or trauma and loss spectrum – work in this area has sought to go beyond the DSM category and consider in more detail a spectrum of severity of symptoms (rather than just presence or absence for diagnostic purposes), as well as a spectrum in terms of the nature of the stressor (e.g. the traumatic incident) and a spectrum of how people respond to trauma. This identifies a significant amount of symptoms and impairment below threshold for DSM diagnosis but nevertheless important, and potentially also present in other disorders a person might be diagnosed with.

A depersonalization-derealization spectrum – although the DSM identifies only a chronic and severe form of depersonalization derealization disorder, and the ICD a 'depersonalization-derealization syndrome', a spectrum of severity has long been identified, including short-lasting episodes commonly experienced in the general population and often associated with other disorders.

=== Obsessions and compulsions ===
An obsessive–compulsive spectrum – this can include a wide range of disorders from Tourette syndrome to the hypochondrias, as well as forms of eating disorder, itself a spectrum of related conditions.

=== General developmental disorders ===
An autistic spectrum – in its simplest form this joins autism and Asperger syndrome, and can additionally include other pervasive developmental disorders (PDD). These include PDD 'not otherwise specified' (including 'atypical autism'), as well as Rett syndrome and childhood disintegrative disorder (CDD). The first three of these disorders are commonly called the autism spectrum disorders; the last two disorders are much rarer, and are sometimes placed in the autism spectrum and sometimes not. The merging of these disorders is based on findings that the symptom profiles are similar, such that individuals are better differentiated by clinical specifiers (i.e. dimensions of severity, such as extent of social communication difficulties or how fixed or restricted behaviors or interests are) and associated features (e.g. known genetic disorders, epilepsy, intellectual disabilities). In the DSM-5, the autism spectrum disorders were unified into a single autism spectrum disorder (ASD).

The term specific developmental disorders is reserved for categorizing particular specific learning disabilities and developmental disorders affecting coordination.

=== Schizophrenia spectrum ===
The schizophrenia spectrum or psychotic spectrum – there are numerous psychotic spectrum disorders already in the DSM, many involving reality distortion. These include:

- Five subtypes of schizophrenia (although eliminated in DSM-5)
- Two forms of shorter duration (schizophreniform disorder and brief psychotic disorder)
- Three delusional disorders (persistent delusional disorder, shared psychotic disorder, other delusional disorders)
- Schizoaffective disorder: symptoms of schizophrenia and a mood disorder (depression or bipolar disorder)
- Catatonia
- Schizotypal personality disorder
- Other and unspecified non-organic psychotic disorders (Atypical psychosis), (inc: chronic hallucinatory psychosis)

Predisposition to schizophrenia is classified with the neologism schizotaxia. There are also traits identified in first degree relatives of those diagnosed with schizophrenia associated with the spectrum. Other spectrum approaches include more specific individual phenomena which may also occur in non-clinical forms in the general population, such as some paranoid beliefs or hearing voices. Psychosis accompanied by mood disorder may be included as a schizophrenia spectrum disorder, or may be classed separately as below.

Schizophrenia spectrum disorders do not necessarily involve psychotic symptoms. Schizoid personality disorder, schizotypal personality disorder, and paranoid personality disorder can be considered 'schizophrenia-like personality disorders' because of their similarities to the schizophrenia spectrum. Some researchers have also proposed that avoidant personality disorder and related social anxiety traits should be considered part of a schizophrenia spectrum. Some sources divide the schizophrenia spectrum into psychotic and non-psychotic disorders, with schizotypal personality disorder included among the non-psychotic disorders (and sometimes schizoid personality disorder as well). The "schizophrenia spectrum" section in the DSM-5 deals with psychotic disorders only, and hence excludes schizotypal personality disorder, while the "schizophrenia spectrum" block in the ICD-11 includes schizotypal personality disorder as well.

From a psychodynamic or psychoanalytic perspective, the distinction between schizoid, schizotypal and avoidant personality disorders is sometimes considered inconsequential, as these disorders are understood to share similar experiential characteristics and be differentiated chiefly by surface-level observations about behavioral differences. Psychotic disorders such as schizophrenia and schizoaffective disorders are then thought to be the psychotic expression of a shared underlying personality structure.

==== Schizoaffective disorders ====
The schizoaffective spectrum – this spectrum refers to features of both psychosis (hallucinations, delusions, thought disorder etc.) and mood disorder. The DSM includes a category of schizoaffective disorder, which may be more affective (mood-related) or more schizophrenic, as well as categories for psychotic bipolar disorder and psychotic depression. A spectrum approach joins these together and may additionally include specific clinical variables and outcomes, which initial research suggests may not be particularly well captured by the different diagnostic categories except at the extremes.

=== Mood ===
A mood disorder (affective) spectrum or bipolar spectrum or depressive spectrum. These approaches have expanded out in different directions. On the one hand, work on major depressive disorder has identified a spectrum of subcategories and sub-threshold symptoms that are prevalent, recurrent and associated with treatment needs. People are found to move between the subtypes and the main diagnostic type over time, suggesting a spectrum. This spectrum can include already recognised categories of minor depressive disorder, 'melancholic depression' and various kinds of atypical depression.

In another direction, numerous links and overlaps have been found between major depressive disorder and bipolar syndromes, including mixed states (simultaneous depression and mania or hypomania). Hypomanic ('below manic') and more rarely manic signs and symptoms have been found in a significant number of cases of major depressive disorder, suggesting not a categorical distinction but a dimension of frequency that is higher in bipolar II and higher again in bipolar I. In addition, numerous subtypes of bipolar have been proposed beyond the types already in the DSM (which includes a milder form called cyclothymia). These extra subgroups have been defined in terms of more detailed gradations of mood severity, or the rapidity of cycling, or the extent or nature of psychotic symptoms. Furthermore, due to shared characteristics between some types of bipolar disorder and borderline personality disorder, some researchers have suggested they may both lie on a spectrum of affective disorders, although others see more links to post-trauma syndromes.

=== Substance use ===
A spectrum of drug use, drug abuse and substance dependence – one spectrum of this type, adopted by the Health Officers Council of British Columbia in 2005, does not employ loaded terms and distinctions such as "use" versus "abuse", but explicitly recognizes a spectrum ranging from potentially beneficial to chronic dependence. The model includes the role not just of the individual but of society, culture and availability of substances. In concert with the identified spectrum of drug use, a spectrum of policy approaches was identified which depended partly on whether the drug in question was available in a legal, for-profit commercial economy, or at the other of the spectrum only in a criminal/prohibition, black-market economy. In addition, a standardized questionnaire has been developed in psychiatry based on a spectrum concept of substance use.

=== Paraphilias and obsessions ===
The interpretative key of "spectrum," developed from the concept of "related disorders," has been considered also in paraphilias.

Paraphilic behavior is triggered by thoughts or urges that are psychopathologically close to obsessive impulsive area. Hollander (1996) includes in the obsessive-compulsive spectrum neurological obsessive disorders, body-perception-related disorders and impulsivity-compulsivity disorders. In this continuum from impulsivity to compulsivity it is particularly hard to find a clear borderline between the two entities.

On this point of view, paraphilias represent such as sexual behaviors due to a high impulsivity-compulsivity drive. It is difficult to distinguish impulsivity from compulsivity: Sometimes paraphilic behaviors are prone to achieve pleasure (desire or fantasy); in some other cases, these attitudes are merely expressions of anxiety, and the atypical behavior is an attempt to reduce anxiety. In the last case, the pleasure gained is short in time and is followed by a new increase in anxiety levels, such as it can be seen in an obsessive patient after he performs his compulsion.

=== Disruptive behavior disorders ===
The disruptive behavior disorders – commonly defined as including oppositional defiant disorder and conduct disorder, with ADHD and antisocial personality disorder sometimes also included – are sometimes viewed as constituting a "disruptive behavior disorder spectrum".

=== Fetal alcohol spectrum disorders ===
Fetal alcohol spectrum disorders have both physical signs (such as facial malformations) but also psychological signs and symptoms, including behavior problems similar to ADHD, learning and speech problems, and intellectual disability.

== Broad spectrum approach ==
Various higher-level types of spectrum have also been proposed, that subsume conditions into fewer but broader overarching groups.

One psychological model based on factor analysis, originating from developmental studies but also applied to adults, posits that many disorders fall on either an "internalizing" spectrum (characterized by negative affectivity; subdivides into a "distress" subspectrum and a "fear" subspectrum) or an "externalizing" spectrum (characterized by negative affectivity plus disinhibition). These spectra are hypothetically linked to underlying variation in some of the big five personality traits. Another theoretical model proposes that the dimensions of fear and anger, defined in a broad sense, underlie a broad spectrum of mood, behavioral and personality disorders. In this model, different combinations of excessive or deficient fear and anger correspond to different neuropsychological temperament types hypothesized to underlie the spectrum of disorders.

Similar approaches refer to the overall "architecture" or "meta-structure," particularly in relation to the development of the DSM or ICD systems. Five proposed meta-structure groupings were recently proposed in this way, based on views and evidence relating to risk factors and clinical presentation. The clusters of disorder that emerged were described as neurocognitive (identified mainly by neural substrate abnormalities), neurodevelopmental (identified mainly by early and continuing cognitive deficits), psychosis (identified mainly by clinical features and biomarkers for information processing deficits), emotional (identified mainly by being preceded by a temperament of negative emotionality), and externalizing (identified mainly be being preceded by disinhibition). However, the analysis was not necessarily able to validate one arrangement over others. From a psychological point of view, it has been suggested that the underlying phenomena are too complex, inter-related and continuous – with too poorly understood a biological or environmental basis – to expect that everything can be mapped into a set of categories for all purposes. In this context the overall system of classification is to some extent arbitrary, and could be thought of as a user interface which may need to satisfy different purposes.

== See also ==
- Classification of mental disorders
- Psychopathology
- Abnormal psychology
- Neurodiversity
- Mentalism (discrimination)
- Recovery approach
- Anhedonia
