= Diagnosis of schizophrenia =

Medical diagnosis based on behavior

The diagnosis of schizophrenia, a psychotic disorder, is based on criteria in either the American Psychiatric Association's Diagnostic and Statistical Manual of Mental Disorders, or the World Health Organization's International Classification of Diseases (ICD). Clinical assessment of schizophrenia is carried out by a mental health professional based on observed behavior, reported experiences, and reports of others familiar with the person. Diagnosis is usually made by a psychiatrist. Associated symptoms occur along a continuum in the population and must reach a certain severity and level of impairment before a diagnosis is made. Schizophrenia has a prevalence rate of 0.3-0.7% in the United States.

== Criteria ==
In 2013, the American Psychiatric Association released the fifth edition of the DSM (DSM-5). According to the manual, to be diagnosed with schizophrenia, two diagnostic criteria have to be met over much of the time of a period of at least one month, with a significant impact on social or occupational functioning for at least six months. The DSM diagnostic criteria outlines that the person has to be experiencing either delusions, hallucinations, or disorganized speech. In other words, an individual does not have to be experiencing delusions or hallucinations to receive a diagnosis of schizophrenia. A second symptom could be negative symptoms, or severely disorganized or catatonic behavior. Only two symptoms are required for a diagnosis of schizophrenia, resulting in different presentations for the same disorder.

In practice, agreement between the two systems is high. The DSM-5 criteria puts more emphasis on social or occupational dysfunction than the ICD-10. The ICD-10, on the other hand, puts more emphasis on first-rank symptoms. The current proposal for the ICD-11 criteria for schizophrenia recommends adding self-disorder as a symptom.

=== Changes made ===
Both manuals have adopted the chapter heading of Schizophrenia spectrum and other psychotic disorders; ICD modifying this as Schizophrenia spectrum and other primary psychotic disorders. The definition of schizophrenia remains essentially the same as that specified by the 2000 text revised DSM-IV (DSM-IV-TR). However, with the publication of DSM-5, the APA removed all sub-classifications of schizophrenia. ICD-11 has also removed subtypes. The removed subtype from both, of catatonic has been relisted in ICD-11 as a psychomotor disturbance that may be present in schizophrenia.

Another major change was to remove the importance previously given to Schneider's first-rank symptoms. DSM-5 still uses the listing of schizophreniform disorder but ICD-11 no longer includes it. DSM-5 also recommends that a better distinction be made between a current condition of schizophrenia and its historical progress, to achieve a clearer overall characterization.

A dimensional assessment has been included in DSM-5 covering eight dimensions of symptoms to be rated (using the Scale to Assess the Severity of Symptom Dimensions) – these include the five diagnostic criteria plus cognitive impairments, mania, and depression. This can add relevant information for the individual in regard to treatment, prognosis, and functional outcome; it also enables the response to treatment to be more accurately described.

Two of the negative symptoms – avolition and diminished emotional expression – have been given more prominence in both manuals.

=== First rank symptoms ===
First-rank symptoms are psychotic symptoms that are particularly characteristic of schizophrenia, which were put forward by Kurt Schneider in 1959. Their reliability for the diagnosis of schizophrenia has been questioned since then. A 2015 systematic review investigated the diagnostic accuracy of first rank symptoms:

First rank symptoms for schizophrenia
Summary
These studies were of limited quality. Results show correct identification of people with schizophrenia in about 75–95% of the cases although it is recommended to consult an additional specialist. The sensitivity of FRS was about 60%, so it can help diagnosis and, when applied with care, mistakes can be avoided. In lower resource settings, when more sophisticated methods are not available, first rank symptoms can be very valuable.

Summary accuracy % (95% CI)	Prevalence median (range)	Implications	Quality and comments
Diagnosis of schizophrenia from all other diagnoses
Sensitivity 57.0 (50.4, 63.3); Specificity 81.4 (74.0, 87.1)	48% (15% to 84%)	Prevalence of 48%: 48 out of every 100 people with all other mental health diagnoses will have schizophrenia. The result means that, of these, 21 will not be identified as having schizophrenia by use of FRS (43% of 48). Then, of the 52 people really without schizophrenia, 10 may be incorrectly diagnosed with schizophrenia by the FRS.	
Diagnosis of schizophrenia from other types of psychosis
Sensitivity 58.0 (50.3, 65.3); Specificity 74.7 (85.2, 82.3)	57% (24% to 84%)	Prevalence of 57%: 57 out of every 100 people with other types of psychosis will have schizophrenia. The result means that, of these, 24 will not be identified as having schizophrenia by use of FRS (42% of 57). Then, of the 43 people really without schizophrenia, 13 may be incorrectly diagnosed with schizophrenia by the FRS.	For all three estimates there are important issues regarding patient selection, use of index test and reference standard. This raises doubts about the accuracy of these findings. Also most studies were not conducted in an everyday clinical setting.
Diagnosis of schizophrenia from non-psychotic disorders
Sensitivity 61.8 (51.7, 71.0); Specificity 94.1 (88.0, 97.2)	55% (19% to 89%)	With a prevalence of 55%, 55 out of every 100 people with non-psychotic disorders will have schizophrenia. Of these, 21 will not be identified as having schizophrenia by use of FRS (38% of 55). Then, of the 45 people really without schizophrenia, 3 may be incorrectly diagnosed with schizophrenia by the FRS.	

== Heterogeneity ==
=== Sub-classifications ===
The DSM-IV-TR contained five sub-classifications of schizophrenia. The sub-classifications were removed in the DSM-5 due to the conditions' heterogeneous nature and their historical insignificance in clinical practice. These were retained in previous revisions largely for reasons of tradition, but had subsequently proved to be of little worth.

The ICD-10 defines seven sub-classifications of schizophrenia. These sub-classifications are:

Sub-classifications of Schizophrenia
ICD-10	Description	DSM-IV-TR Equivalent
Paranoid (F20.0)	Delusions and hallucinations are present but thought disorder, disorganized behavior, and affective flattening are not prominent.	Paranoid type (295.3)
Hebephrenic (F20.1)	Thought disorder and flat affect are present together.	Disorganized type (295.1)
Catatonic (F20.2)	Psychomotor disturbances are dominant features. Symptoms can include catatonic stupor and waxy flexibility.	Catatonic type (295.2)
Undifferentiated (F20.3)	Psychotic symptoms are present but the criteria for paranoid, disorganized, or catatonic types have not been met.	Undifferentiated type (295.9)
Post-schizophrenic depression (F20.4)	A depressive episode arising in the aftermath of a schizophrenic illness where some low-level schizophrenic symptoms may still be present.	Not present
Residual (F20.5)	Positive symptoms are present at a low intensity and negative symptoms are prominent.	Residual type (295.6)
Simple (F20.6)	Delusions and hallucinations are not evident and negative symptoms progress slowly.	Not present
Other (F20.8)	Includes cenesthopathic schizophrenia and schizophreniform disorder NOS	Not present

==== Country-specific versions ====
The ICD-10 Clinical Modification, used for medical coding and reporting in the United States excludes the post-schizophrenic depression (F20.4) and the Simple (F20.6) sub-classifications.

The Russian version of the ICD-10 includes additional four sub-classifications of schizophrenia: hypochondriacal (F20.801), cenesthopathic (F20.802), childhood type (F20.803), and atypical (F20.804).

=== Comorbidities ===
People with schizophrenia often have additional mental health problems such as anxiety, depressive, or substance-use disorders. Schizophrenia occurs along with obsessive-compulsive disorder (OCD) considerably more often than could be explained by chance. An estimated 21% to 47% of patients with schizophrenia have a substance misuse disorder at some time in their life, and the chances of developing a substance misuse disorder is significantly higher among patients with a psychotic illness. All of these factors result in an increased range of clinical presentations and suggest a significant etiological heterogeneity.

=== Sex differences ===
Schizophrenia is diagnosed 1.4 times more frequently in males than females, with onset peaking at ages 20–28 years for males and 4–10 years later in females. Females show more psychotic and affective symptoms than males, and have less social impairment. Men present more often with negative symptoms and disorganization. These differences are likely due to the protective effects of estrogen and are correlated with estrogen expression.

=== Prelingually deaf persons ===
Usually, psychiatric diagnostics is carried out orally. Thus, the question about schizophrenia in prelingually deaf persons rises. Only few reports exist. A review points out that acoustic hallucinations of normal hearing schizophrenic people correspond to visual and tactile hallucinations of prelingually deaf persons. Also, the structure of the (sign-) language is altered in ill persons. As a follow, "schizophrenia does not depend on the acoustic part of language or the acquisition of spoken language".

=== Onset ===
Early-onset schizophrenia occurs before the age of 17, and very-early onset schizophrenia occurs before the age of 13. late-onset occurs after the age of 40, and very-late-onset after the age of 60. It is estimated that 15% of the population with schizophrenia are late-onset and 5% very-late onset. Many of the symptoms of late-onset schizophrenia are similar to the early-onset. However, individuals with late-onsets are more likely to report hallucinations in all sensory modalities, as well as persecutory and partition delusions. On the other hand, late-onset cases are less likely to present with formal thought disorder, affective symptoms. Negative symptoms and cognitive impairment are also rarer in very-late onset cases.

=== Etiology ===
The pathophysiology of schizophrenia is poorly understood. Multiple hypotheses have been put forward, with evidence both supporting and contradicting them. The most commonly supported theories are the dopamine hypothesis and the glutamate hypothesis. Multiple genetic and environment factors have been associated with increased risk for developing schizophrenia. Furthermore, response to treatment with anti-psychotic medication is variable, with some patients being resistant to some therapies. Together, the differences in causes, response to treatment and pathophysiology suggest schizophrenia is heterogeneous from an etiological standpoint. The differences resulting from this in terms of in clinical manifestations make the disorder harder to diagnose.

=== Genetic ===
Multiple genetic and environmental factors contribute to the development of the schizophrenic phenotype. Distinct symptomatic sub types of schizophrenia groups show distinct patterns of SNP variations, reflecting the heterogeneous nature of the disease. Studies also suggest there is a genetic overlap between schizophrenia and other psychiatric disorders, such as autism spectrum disorders, attention deficit-hyperactivity disorder, bipolar disorder, and major depressive disorder. These factors complicate the use of genetic tests in diagnosis or prediction of the onset of schizophrenia.

== Differential diagnosis ==
If signs of disturbance are present for more than a month but less than six months, the diagnosis of schizophreniform disorder is applied. Psychotic symptoms lasting less than a month may be diagnosed as brief psychotic disorder, and various conditions may be classed as psychotic disorder not otherwise specified. Schizoaffective disorder is diagnosed if symptoms of mood disorder are substantially present alongside psychotic symptoms.

Psychotic symptoms may be present in several other mental disorders, including bipolar disorder, and borderline personality disorder. Delusions ("non-bizarre") are also present in delusional disorder, and social withdrawal in social anxiety disorder, avoidant personality disorder and schizotypal personality disorder. Schizophrenia cannot be diagnosed if symptoms of mood disorder are substantially present, or if symptoms of pervasive developmental disorder are present unless prominent delusions or hallucinations are also present. Schizophrenia is further complicated with obsessive-compulsive disorder (OCD), and it can be difficult to distinguish obsessions that occur in OCD from the delusions of schizophrenia. In children hallucinations must be separated from typical childhood fantasies.

A urine drug screen must be performed to determine if the cause for symptoms could be drug intoxication or drug-induced psychosis. For example, a few people withdrawing from benzodiazepines experience a severe withdrawal syndrome which may last a long time and can resemble schizophrenia. A general medical and neurological examination may also be needed to rule out medical illnesses which may rarely produce psychotic schizophrenia-like symptoms, such as metabolic disturbance, systemic infection, syphilis, HIV infection, epilepsy, and brain lesions. Stroke, multiple sclerosis, hyperthyroidism, hypothyroidism, and dementias such as Alzheimer's disease, Huntington's disease, frontotemporal dementia, and the Lewy body dementias may also be associated with schizophrenia-like psychotic symptoms. It may be necessary to rule out a delirium, which can be distinguished by visual hallucinations, acute onset and fluctuating level of consciousness, and indicates an underlying medical illness. Investigations are not generally repeated for relapse unless there is a specific medical indication or possible adverse effects from antipsychotic medication.

== Biomarkers ==
A biomarker, as defined by the National Institutes of Health Biomarkers Definitions Working Group, is "a biologic characteristic objectively measured and evaluated as an indicator of normal or pathogenic processes; or of response to a treatment or challenge". Biomarkers of psychosis for use in clinical tests can be diagnostic, prognostic, predictive of conversion, or monitoring of progression. Clinical tests have many benefits: they can provide confidence in a diagnosis, allow clinicians to make better informed choices in regard to treatment, or even make it possible to identify subjects which can benefit from therapy to prevent transition into schizophrenia. Currently, no biomarkers that can be widely used in clinical practice for the diagnosis of schizophrenia have been identified.

=== Imaging ===
Brain imaging, such as CT and MRI scans, are currently only used to rule out brain abnormalities, and their benefit is very limited at that. Structural alterations have, however, been identified in schizophrenia, most commonly enlarged ventricles, and decreased grey matter volume in the cortex and hippocampus. Studies using functional MRI have also shown that altered connectivity and activity in present in schizophrenia.

In the last decade interest has grown in the use of machine learning to automatically perform the diagnosis task using brain imaging data. While these algorithms are very robust at distinguishing schizophrenia patients from healthy subjects, they still cannot perform the tasks clinicians struggle the most with – differential diagnosis and treatment selection.

=== Blood-based ===
Blood-based biomarkers those are obtained from plasma or serum samples. Since the prevalence of metabolic syndromes is increased in schizophrenia patients, makers of those syndromes have been common targets of research. Differences between patients and controls have been found in insulin levels, insulin resistance, and glucose tolerance. These effects are generally small, however, and often present only in a subset of patients, which results from the heterogeneity of the disease. Furthermore, these results are often complicated by the metabolic side effects of anti-psychotic medication. Serum levels of hormones typically active in the hypothalamic pituitary adrenal (HPA) axis, such as cortisol and acetylcholine, have also been correlated with symptoms and progression of schizophrenia. Peripheral biomarkers of immune function have also been a major target of research, with over 75 candidates having been identified. Cytokines and growth factors are consistently identified as candidates by different studies, but variation in identity and direction of the correlation is common. In recent years, markers of oxidative stress, epigentic methylation, mRNA transcription, and proteomic expression have also been targets of research, with their potential still to be determined. It is likely that no single biomarker will be clinically useful, but rather a biomarker assay would have to be performed, like the well-performing 51 marker assay developed by E. Schwarz and colleagues.

=== Genetic ===
Estimates of the heritability of schizophrenia is around 80%, which implies that 80% of the individual differences in risk to schizophrenia is explained by individual differences in genetics. Although many genetic variants associated with schizophrenia have been identified, their effects are usually very small, so they are combined onto a polygenic risk score. These scores, despite accounting for hundreds of variants, only explain up to 6% in symptom variation and 7% of the risk for developing the disease. An example of a well-studied genetic biomarker in schizophrenia is the single nucleotide polymorphism in the HLA-DQB1 gene, which is part of the human leukocyte antigen (HLA) complex. A G to C replacement on position 6672 predicts risk of agranulocytosis, a side effect of clozapine that can be fatal.

== Criticisms of classification systems ==
=== Spectrum of conditions ===
There is an argument that the underlying issues would be better addressed as a spectrum of conditions or as individual dimensions along which everyone varies rather than by a diagnostic category based on an arbitrary cut-off between normal and ill. This approach appears consistent with research on schizotypy, and with a relatively high prevalence of psychotic experiences, mostly non-distressing delusional beliefs, among the general public. In concordance with this observation, psychologist Edgar Jones, and psychiatrists Tony David and Nassir Ghaemi, surveying the existing literature on delusions, pointed out that the consistency and completeness of the definition of delusion have been found wanting by many; delusions are neither necessarily fixed nor false, and need not involve the presence of incontrovertible evidence.

=== Diagnostic criteria ===
Nancy Andreasen has criticized the current DSM-IV and ICD-10 criteria for sacrificing diagnostic validity for the sake of artificially improving reliability. She argues that overemphasis on psychosis in the diagnostic criteria, while improving diagnostic reliability, ignores more fundamental cognitive impairments that are harder to assess due to large variations in presentation. This view is supported by other psychiatrists. In the same vein, Ming Tsuang and colleagues argue that psychotic symptoms may be a common end-state in a variety of disorders, including schizophrenia, rather than a reflection of the specific etiology of schizophrenia, and warn that there is little basis for regarding DSM's operational definition as the "true" construct of schizophrenia. Neuropsychologist Michael Foster Green went further in suggesting the presence of specific neurocognitive deficits may be used to construct phenotypes that are alternatives to those that are purely symptom-based. These deficits take the form of a reduction or impairment in basic psychological functions such as memory, attention, executive function and problem solving.

The exclusion of affective components from the criteria for schizophrenia, despite their ubiquity in clinical settings, has also caused contention. This exclusion in the DSM has resulted in a "rather convoluted" separate disorder—schizoaffective disorder. Citing poor interrater reliability, some psychiatrists have totally contested the concept of schizoaffective disorder as a separate entity. The categorical distinction between mood disorders and schizophrenia, known as the Kraepelinian dichotomy, has also been challenged by data from genetic epidemiology.

=== Biological validity ===
As clinicians and researchers become increasingly aware of the limitations of the current diagnostic systems, calls for new nosology are being made. The National Institute of Health's Research of Domain Criteria (RDoC) research program, launched in 2009, is perhaps the largest combined effort to address the need for a new approach in classifying mental disorders. The European Roadmap for Mental Health Research (ROAMER) funding initiative shares many goals with RDoC. These initiatives encourage researchers to consider diagnosis as dimensional, instead of a clear-cut between patients and healthy subjects, and to cut across diagnostic boundaries. The goal is to develop biologically valid diagnosis by defining nosology based on biological measures instead of symptom profiles, as is done currently. Initial efforts in this area have been able to stratify patients along the psychosis continuum into genetically distinct sub types based on their symptoms, brain measures such as EEG, and serum biomarker profiles.
