= Childhood schizophrenia =

Childhood-onset schizophrenia

- Other names: Childhood-type schizophrenia; schizophrenia, childhood type; childhood-onset schizophrenia (COS); very early-onset schizophrenia (VEOS); schizophrenic syndrome of childhood
- Specialty: Child psychiatry (European Union), child and adolescent psychiatry (United States), clinical psychology
- Symptoms: Hallucinations, delusions, disorganized behavior, catatonia, negative symptoms (i.e., avolition or reduced affect display)
- Usual onset: Before the age of 13 years
- Types: Episodic-progredient/shiftlike childhood schizophrenia (malignant, paranoid, and slow-progressive subtypes), continuous childhood schizophrenia, recurrent childhood schizophrenia (the rarest form—5 % of all cases)
- Differential diagnosis: Major depressive disorder or bipolar disorder with psychotic or catatonic features, brief psychotic disorder, delusional disorder, obsessive–compulsive disorder and body dysmorphic disorder, autism spectrum disorder or communication disorders, other mental disorders associated with a psychotic episode
- Medication: Antipsychotics
- Frequency: 1/5 of all forms of psychosis of the schizophrenia spectrum; 1.66 per 1000 children (0–14 years)

Childhood schizophrenia (also known as childhood-onset schizophrenia and very early-onset schizophrenia) is similar in characteristics to schizophrenia that develops at a later age, with the major difference being an onset before the age of 13 years and a more challenging diagnosis. Schizophrenia is characterized by positive symptoms that can include hallucinations, delusions, and disorganized speech; negative symptoms, such as blunted affect, avolition, and apathy, and a number of cognitive impairments. Differential diagnosis is often problematic since several other neurodevelopmental disorders, including autism spectrum disorder, language disorder, and attention-deficit/hyperactivity disorder, also have signs and symptoms similar to childhood-onset schizophrenia.

The disorder is associated with symptoms like auditory and visual hallucinations, delusional thoughts or feelings, and abnormal behavior, profoundly impacting the child's ability to function and sustain normal interpersonal relationships. Delusions are often vague and less developed than those of adult-onset schizophrenia, which features more systematized delusions. Among the psychotic symptoms seen in childhood schizophrenia, non-verbal auditory hallucinations are the most common and often sound like shots, knocks, and bangs. Other symptoms can include irritability, searching for imaginary objects, low performance, and a higher rate of tactile hallucinations compared to adult-onset schizophrenia. It typically presents after the age of seven. About 50% of young children diagnosed with schizophrenia experience severe neuropsychiatric symptoms. Studies have demonstrated that diagnostic criteria are similar to those of adult-onset schizophrenia. Neither DSM-5 nor ICD-11 list "childhood schizophrenia" as a separate diagnosis. The diagnosis is based on a thorough history and psychiatric examination by a child psychiatrist, exclusion of medical causes of psychosis (often by extensive testing), observations by caregivers and schools, and, in some cases (depending on age), self-reports from pediatric patients.

== Classification of mental disorders ==
=== Diagnostic and Statistical Manual of Mental Disorders ===
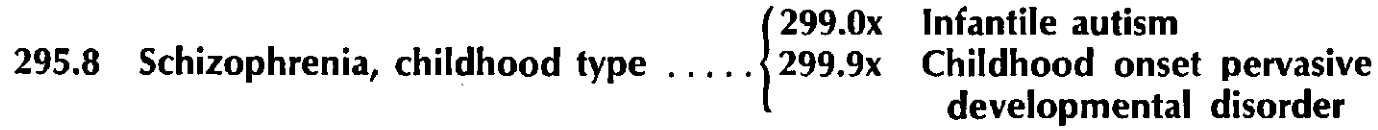
DSM-III. American Psychiatric Association against childhood schizophrenia as a separate diagnosis.

Childhood schizophrenia was not directly added to the DSM until 1968, when it was added to the DSM-II, which set forth diagnostic criteria similar to that of adult schizophrenia. "Schizophrenia, childhood type" was a DSM-II diagnosis with diagnostic code 295.8, equivalent to "schizophrenic reaction, childhood type" (code 000-x28) in DSM-I (1952). "Schizophrenia, childhood type" was successfully removed from the DSM-III (1980), and in the Appendix C they wrote: "there is currently no way of predicting which children will develop Schizophrenia as adults". Instead of childhood schizophrenia they proposed to use of "infantile autism" (299.0x) and "childhood onset pervasive developmental disorder" (299.9x).

In the DSM-III-R (1987), DSM-IV (1994), DSM-IV-TR (2000), DSM-5 (2013) there is no "childhood schizophrenia". The rationale for this approach was that, since the clinical pictures of adult schizophrenia and childhood schizophrenia are identical, childhood schizophrenia should not be a separate disorder. However, the section in schizophrenia's Development and Course in DSM-5, includes references to childhood-onset schizophrenia.

=== International Classification of Diseases ===
In the International Classification of Diseases 8th revision (ICD-8, 1967) there was a category (295.8) "Other" in the schizophrenia section (295). "Other" includes: atypical forms of schizophrenia, infantile autism, schizophrenia, childhood type, NOS (Not Otherwise Specified), schizophrenia of specified type not classifiable under 295.0–295.7, schizophreniform attack or psychosis.

Unspecified psychoses with origin specific to childhood (code 299.9) in the International Classification of Diseases 9th revision (ICD-9) includes "child psychosis NOS", "schizophrenia, childhood type NOS" and "schizophrenic syndrome of childhood NOS".

"Childhood type schizophrenia" available in the Soviet adopted version of the ICD-9 (code 299.91) and the Russian adopted version of the 10th revision ICD-10 (code F20.8xx3) and the U.S. adopted the 10th revision ICD-10 (code F20.9x6) classified "schizophrenia, unspecified".

== Signs and symptoms ==
Schizophrenia is a mental disorder that is expressed in abnormal mental functions, a loss of one's sense of identity and self, a compromised perception of reality, and disturbed behavior.

The signs and symptoms of childhood schizophrenia are similar to those of adult-onset schizophrenia. Some of the earliest signs that a young child may develop schizophrenia are lags in language and motor development. Some children engage in activities such as flapping the arms or rocking, and may appear anxious, confused, or disruptive on a regular basis. Children may experience hallucinations, but these are often difficult to differentiate from just normal imagination or child play. Visual hallucinations are more commonly found in children than in adults. It is often difficult for children to describe their hallucinations or delusions, making very early-onset schizophrenia especially difficult to diagnose in the earliest stages. The cognitive abilities of children with schizophrenia may also often be lacking, with 20% of patients showing borderline or full intellectual disability.

Negative symptoms include apathy, avolition, alogia, anhedonia, asociality, and blunted emotional affect.

- Apathy is an overall lack of interest or enjoyment, which relates to the negative symptom of blunted emotional affect.
- Blunted emotional affect includes a lack of facial expressions, lack of intonation while speaking, and little eye contact. If you are speaking to someone who has blunted emotional affect, it would be difficult to determine their feelings using their facial expressions and tone.
- Avolition is experienced when the child shows few goal-focused behaviors and choices, and a lack of interest in goal-related activities, including personal hygiene.
- Alogia can be seen when people use few words and lack fluency while speaking.
- Anhedonia relates to an inability to find pleasure in activities that one previously found enjoyable, as well as the inability to remember previous enjoyable memories.
- Asociality is a symptom seen when a person has no interest in socializing with others.

These negative symptoms can severely impact children's and adolescents' abilities to function in school and in other public settings.

Very early-onset schizophrenia refers to onset before the age of thirteen. The prodromal phase, which precedes psychotic symptoms, is characterized by deterioration in school performance, social withdrawal, disorganized or unusual behavior, a decreased ability to perform daily activities, a deterioration in self-care skills, bizarre hygiene and eating behaviors, changes in affect, a lack of impulse control, hostility and aggression, and lethargy.

Auditory hallucinations are the most common of the positive symptoms in children. Auditory hallucinations may include voices that are conversing with each other or voices that are speaking directly to the children themselves. Many children with auditory hallucinations believe that if they do not listen to the voices, the voices will harm them or someone else. Tactile and visual hallucinations seem relatively rare. Children often attribute the hallucinatory voices to a variety of beings, including family members or other people, evil forces ("the Devil", "a witch", "a spirit"), animals, characters from horror movies (Bloody Mary, Freddy Krueger) and less clearly recognizable sources ("bad things," "the whispers"). Delusions are reported in more than half of children with schizophrenia, but they are usually less complex than those of adults. Delusions are often connected with hallucinatory experiences. Command auditory hallucinations (also known as imperative hallucinations) were common and experienced by more than half of the group in a study at Bellevue Hospital Center's Children's Psychiatric Inpatient Unit. In this study, delusions were characterized as persecutory for the most part, but some children reported delusions of control. Many said they were being tortured by the beings causing their visual and auditory hallucinations; some thought disobeying their voices would cause them harm.

Some degree of thought disorder was observed in a test group of children at Bellevue Hospital. They displayed illogicality, tangentiality (a serious disturbance in the associative thought process), and loosening of associations.

== Pathogenesis ==
Several environmental factors, including perinatal complications and prenatal maternal infections may contribute to the etiology of schizophrenia. Prenatal rubella or influenza infections are associated with childhood-onset schizophrenia. Severity or frequency of prenatal infections may also contribute to earlier onset of symptoms by means of congenital brain malformations, reduction or impairment of cognitive function, and psychological disorders. It is believed that prenatal exposure to rubella modifies the developmental course during childhood, increasing the risk for childhood schizophrenia. Genetic predisposition is an important factor as well; familial mental illness is more frequently reported for childhood-onset schizophrenic patients. While it is hard to detect, there are relatives who are more-likely to be diagnosed with schizophrenia if they are children of individuals who have this disorder. "First degree relatives" are found to have the highest chance of being diagnosed with schizophrenia. Children of individuals with schizophrenia have a 8.2% chance of having schizophrenia while the general population is at an 0.86% chance of having this disorder. These results indicate that genes play a big role in one developing schizophrenia.

=== Genetic ===
There is "considerable overlap" in the genetics of childhood-onset and adult-onset schizophrenia, but in childhood-onset schizophrenia there is a higher number of "rare allelic variants". There have been several genes indicated in children diagnosed with schizophrenia that include: neuregulin, dysbindin, D-amino acid oxidase, proline dehydrogenase, catechol-Omethyltransferase, and regulator of G protein signaling. There have also been findings of 5HT2A and dopamine D3 receptor. An important gene for adolescent-onset schizophrenia is the catechol-O-methyltransferase gene, a gene that regulates dopamine. Children with schizophrenia have an increase in genetic deletions or duplication mutations and some have a specific mutation called 22q11 deletion syndrome, which accounts for up to 2% of cases.

=== Neuroanatomical ===
Neuroimaging studies have found differences between the medicated brains of individuals with schizophrenia, and the brains of those without, though research does not know the cause of the difference. In childhood-onset schizophrenia, there appears to be a more rapid loss of cerebral grey matter during adolescence. Studies have reported that adverse childhood experiences (ACEs) are the most preventable cause of the development of psychiatric disorders such as schizophrenia. ACEs have the potential to impact on the structure and function of the brain; structural changes revealed have been related to stress. Findings also report that different areas of the brain are affected by different types of maltreatment.

== Diagnosis ==
In 2013, the American Psychiatric Association released the fifth edition of the DSM (DSM-5). According to the manual, to be diagnosed with schizophrenia, two diagnostic criteria have to be met over much of the time of a period of at least one month, with a significant impact on social or occupational functioning for at least six months. The DSM diagnostic criteria outlines that the person has to be experiencing either delusions, hallucinations, or disorganized speech. In other words, an individual does not have to be experiencing delusions or hallucinations to receive a diagnosis of schizophrenia. A second symptom could be negative symptoms, or severely disorganized or catatonic behavior. Only two symptoms are required for a diagnosis of schizophrenia, resulting in different presentations for the same disorder.

In practice, agreement between the two systems is high. The DSM-5 criteria puts more emphasis on social or occupational dysfunction than the ICD-10. The ICD-10, on the other hand, puts more emphasis on first-rank symptoms. The current proposal for the ICD-11 criteria for schizophrenia recommends adding self-disorder as a symptom.

=== Changes made ===
Both manuals have adopted the chapter heading of Schizophrenia spectrum and other psychotic disorders; ICD modifying this as Schizophrenia spectrum and other primary psychotic disorders. The definition of schizophrenia remains essentially the same as that specified by the 2000 text revised DSM-IV (DSM-IV-TR). However, with the publication of DSM-5, the APA removed all sub-classifications of schizophrenia. ICD-11 has also removed subtypes. The removed subtype from both, of catatonic has been relisted in ICD-11 as a psychomotor disturbance that may be present in schizophrenia.

Another major change was to remove the importance previously given to Schneider's first-rank symptoms. DSM-5 still uses the listing of schizophreniform disorder but ICD-11 no longer includes it. DSM-5 also recommends that a better distinction be made between a current condition of schizophrenia and its historical progress, to achieve a clearer overall characterization.

A dimensional assessment has been included in DSM-5 covering eight dimensions of symptoms to be rated (using the Scale to Assess the Severity of Symptom Dimensions) – these include the five diagnostic criteria plus cognitive impairments, mania, and depression. This can add relevant information for the individual in regard to treatment, prognosis, and functional outcome; it also enables the response to treatment to be more accurately described.

Two of the negative symptoms – avolition and diminished emotional expression – have been given more prominence in both manuals.

=== First rank symptoms ===
First-rank symptoms are psychotic symptoms that are particularly characteristic of schizophrenia, which were put forward by Kurt Schneider in 1959. Their reliability for the diagnosis of schizophrenia has been questioned since then. A 2015 systematic review investigated the diagnostic accuracy of first rank symptoms:

First rank symptoms for schizophrenia
Summary
These studies were of limited quality. Results show correct identification of people with schizophrenia in about 75–95% of the cases although it is recommended to consult an additional specialist. The sensitivity of FRS was about 60%, so it can help diagnosis and, when applied with care, mistakes can be avoided. In lower resource settings, when more sophisticated methods are not available, first rank symptoms can be very valuable.

Summary accuracy % (95% CI)	Prevalence median (range)	Implications	Quality and comments
Diagnosis of schizophrenia from all other diagnoses
Sensitivity 57.0 (50.4, 63.3); Specificity 81.4 (74.0, 87.1)	48% (15% to 84%)	Prevalence of 48%: 48 out of every 100 people with all other mental health diagnoses will have schizophrenia. The result means that, of these, 21 will not be identified as having schizophrenia by use of FRS (43% of 48). Then, of the 52 people really without schizophrenia, 10 may be incorrectly diagnosed with schizophrenia by the FRS.	
Diagnosis of schizophrenia from other types of psychosis
Sensitivity 58.0 (50.3, 65.3); Specificity 74.7 (85.2, 82.3)	57% (24% to 84%)	Prevalence of 57%: 57 out of every 100 people with other types of psychosis will have schizophrenia. The result means that, of these, 24 will not be identified as having schizophrenia by use of FRS (42% of 57). Then, of the 43 people really without schizophrenia, 13 may be incorrectly diagnosed with schizophrenia by the FRS.	For all three estimates there are important issues regarding patient selection, use of index test and reference standard. This raises doubts about the accuracy of these findings. Also most studies were not conducted in an everyday clinical setting.
Diagnosis of schizophrenia from non-psychotic disorders
Sensitivity 61.8 (51.7, 71.0); Specificity 94.1 (88.0, 97.2)	55% (19% to 89%)	With a prevalence of 55%, 55 out of every 100 people with non-psychotic disorders will have schizophrenia. Of these, 21 will not be identified as having schizophrenia by use of FRS (38% of 55). Then, of the 45 people really without schizophrenia, 3 may be incorrectly diagnosed with schizophrenia by the FRS.	

The same criteria are used to diagnose children and adults. Diagnosis is based on reports by parents or caretakers, teachers, school officials, and others close to the child.

A professional who believes a child has schizophrenia usually conducts a series of tests to rule out other causes of behavior, and pinpoint a diagnosis. Three different types of study are performed: physical, laboratory, and psychological. Physical exams usually cover the basic assessments, including but not limited to; height, weight, blood pressure, and checking all vital signs to make sure the child is healthy. Laboratory tests include electroencephalogram EEG screening and brain imaging scans. Blood tests are used to rule out alcohol or drug effects, and thyroid hormone levels are tested to rule out hyper- or hypothyroidism. A psychologist or psychiatrist talks to a child about their thoughts, feelings, and behavior patterns. They also inquire about the severity of the symptoms, and the effects they have on the child's daily life. They may also discuss thoughts of suicide or self-harm in these one-on-one sessions. Some symptoms that may be looked at are early language delays, early motor development delays, and school problems.

Many people with childhood schizophrenia are initially misdiagnosed as having pervasive developmental disorders (autism spectrum disorder, for example).

=== Differential diagnosis ===
The onset of childhood schizophrenia usually follows a period of normal, or near normal, development. Strange interests, unusual beliefs, and social impairment can be prodromal symptoms of childhood schizophrenia, but can also be signs of autism spectrum disorder. Hallucinations and delusions are typical for schizophrenia, but not features of autism spectrum disorder. In children hallucinations must be separated from typical childhood fantasies. Since childhood disintegrative disorder (CDD) has a very similar set of symptoms and high comorbidity it can be misdiagnosed as childhood schizophrenia, which can lead to prescribing ineffective medications.

Childhood schizophrenia can be difficult to diagnosis simply because of how many disorders mimic the symptoms of CS. Though it can be difficult, that is why it is important to examine the whole mental state of the child at that time. Accurate and timely diagnosis is crucial, as misdiagnosis can adversely affect long-term treatment outcomes and prognosis. Individuals who experience disorders such as major depressive disorder, schizoaffective disorder, schizophreniform disorder, brief psychotic disorder, delusional disorder and schizotypal personality disorder have all been known to exhibit similar symptoms to children who have been diagnosed with CS.

The three most common disorders that are difficult to distinguish are bipolar disorder (BD), autism spectrum disorder (ASD), and attention deficit hyperactive disorder (ADHD). BD, ASD, and ADHD overlap with symptom patterns in CS but a few distinguishing factors helps differentiate the disorders. Understanding these differences is crucial to diagnosing the child.

Individuals with bipolar disorder and childhood schizophrenia can both present psychotic symptoms such as hallucinations, delusions, and disorganized behaviors. A distinguishing feature in childhood schizophrenia, the hallucination, aren't taking place during a 'depressive or manic' episode as it would for an individual diagnosed with bipolar disorder. An individual with bipolar disorder has both low and high moods while one with CS exhibits elements of depression.

Autism spectrum disorder share many features that are present in CS such as disorganized speech, social deficits, and extremely bizarre and repetitive behaviors. A hallmark of CS and distinguishing factor is when hallucinations last longer than one month. Should this occur, further examinations are necessary to determine if the child has ASD or CS.

Unlike the previous two disorders, ADHD and CS have fewer commonalities. Both individuals who have been diagnosed with CS and ADHD may appear to exhibit a poor attention span and disorganization. "Psychotic episodes are absent in ADHD, a distinct difference from CS".

It is important to understand that children diagnosed with childhood schizophrenia have higher rates of comorbidity, so exploring all resources is necessary to properly diagnose the child.

== Prevention ==
Research efforts are focusing on prevention in identifying early signs from relatives with associated disorders similar to schizophrenia and those with prenatal and birth complications. Prevention has been an ongoing challenge because early signs of the disorder are similar to those of other disorders. Also, some of the schizophrenic-related symptoms are often found in children without schizophrenia or any other diagnosable disorder.

== Treatment ==
Current methods in treating early-onset schizophrenia follow a similar approach to the treatment of adult schizophrenia. Although methods of treatment for childhood schizophrenia are largely understudied, the use of antipsychotic medicine is normally the primary line of treatment in addressing signs in childhood schizophrenia diagnoses. Contemporary practices of schizophrenia treatment are multidisciplinary, recuperation oriented, and consist of medications, with psychosocial interventions that include familial support systems. However, research has shown that atypical antipsychotics may be preferable because they cause less short-term side effects. When weighing treatment options, it is necessary to consider the adverse effects, such as metabolic syndrome, of various medications used to treat schizophrenia and the potential implications of these effects on development. A 2013 systematic review compared the efficacy of atypical antipsychotics versus typical antipsychotics for adolescents:

Atypical compared with typical antipsychotics (only short term)
Summary
There is not any convincing evidence suggesting that atypical antipsychotic medications are superior to the older typical medications for the treatment of adolescents with psychosis. However, atypical antipsychotic medications may be more acceptable because fewer symptomatic adverse effects are seen in the short term. Little evidence is available to support the superiority of one atypical antipsychotic medication over another.

Outcome	Findings in words	Findings in numbers	Quality of evidence
Global state
Worse or no improvement	There is no clear difference between the newer atypical antipsychotic drugs and the typical drugs for this global outcome. These findings are based on data of low quality.	RR 3.3 (0.41 to 26.81)	Low
Adverse effects
Anticholinergic adverse effects	Atypical probably reduces the chance of experiencing dry mouth, constipation, and blurred vision but often doses of the older drugs are such that these types of adverse effects are to be expected. Lower doses of control drug could have offset this risk. Data are based on moderate quality evidence.	RR 0.2 (0.05 to 0.8)	Moderate
Leaving the study because of adverse effects	Use of atypical drugs may increase the chance of leaving early because of adverse effects, but the difference between the treatments is not clear. Data supporting this finding are based on moderate quality evidence.	RR 3.3 (0.41 to 26.81)	Moderate

Madaan et al. wrote that studies report efficacy of typical neuroleptics such as thioridazine, thiothixene, loxapine and haloperidol, high incidence of side effects such as extrapyramidal symptoms, akathisia, dystonias, sedation, elevated prolactin, tardive dyskinesia.

== Prognosis ==
A very-early diagnosis of schizophrenia leads to a worse prognosis than other psychotic disorders. The primary area that children with schizophrenia must adapt to is their social surroundings. It has been found, however, that very early-onset schizophrenia carried a more severe prognosis than later-onset schizophrenia. Regardless of treatment, children diagnosed with schizophrenia at an early age have diminished social skills, such as educational and vocational abilities.

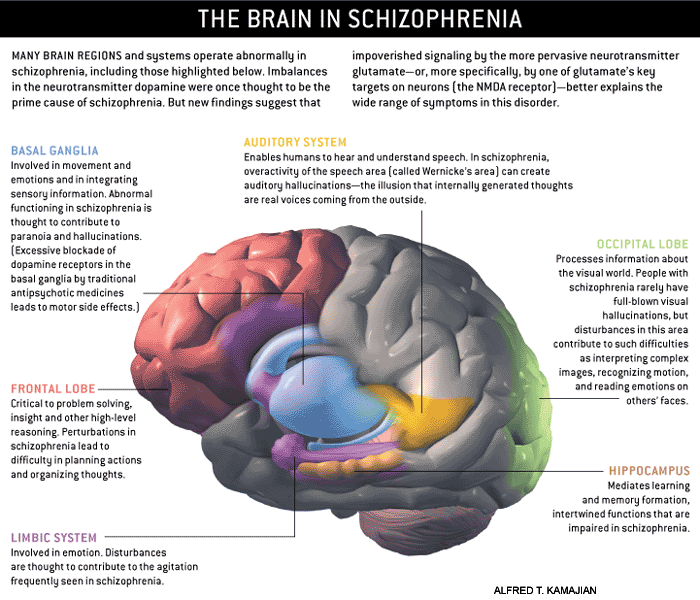

The grey matter in the cerebral cortex of the brain shrinks over time in people with schizophrenia; the question of whether antipsychotic medication exacerbates or causes this has been controversial. A 2015 meta-analysis found that there is a positive correlation between the cumulative amount of first generation antipsychotics taken by people with schizophrenia and the amount of grey matter loss, and a negative correlation with the cumulative amount of second-generation antipsychotics taken.

== Epidemiology ==
Schizophrenia disorders in children are rare. Boys are twice as likely to be diagnosed with childhood schizophrenia. There is often a disproportionately large number of males with childhood schizophrenia, because the age of onset of the disorder is earlier in males than females by about 5 years. Clinicians have been and still are reluctant to diagnose schizophrenia early on, primarily due to the stigma attached to it.

While very early-onset schizophrenia is a rare event, with prevalence of about 1:40,000, early-onset schizophrenia manifests more often, with an estimated prevalence of 0.5%.

== History ==
Until the late nineteenth century, children were often diagnosed with psychosis like schizophrenia, but instead were said to have "pubescent" or "developmental" insanity. Through the 1950s, childhood psychosis began to become more and more common, and psychiatrists began to take a deeper look into the issue.

Sante De Sanctis first wrote about child psychoses, in 1905. He called the condition "dementia praecocissima" (Latin, "very premature madness"), by analogy to the term then used for schizophrenia, "dementia praecox" (Latin, "premature madness). De Sanctis characterized the condition by the presence of catatonia. Philip Bromberg thinks that "dementia praecocissima" is in some cases indistinguishable from childhood schizophrenia; Leo Kanner believed that "dementia praecocissima" encompassed a number of pathological conditions.

Theodor Heller discovered a new syndrome dementia infantilis (Latin, "infantile madness") in 1909 which was named Heller syndrome. In ICD-11 Heller syndrome is classed as an autism spectrum subtype.

In 1909, Julius Raecke reported on ten cases of catatonia in children at the Psychiatric and Neurological Hospital of Kiel University, where he worked. He described symptoms similar to those previously recorded by Dr. Karl Ludwig Kahlbaum, including "stereotypies and bizarre urges, impulsive motor eruptions and blind apathy." He also reported refusal to eat, stupor with mutism, uncleanliness, indications of waxy flexibility and unmotivated eccentricity, and childish behavior.

A 1913 paper by Karl Pönitz, "Contribution to the Recognition of Early Catatonia", recounts a case study of a boy who manifested "typical catatonia" from the age of twelve, characterizing him as showing a "clear picture of schizophrenia."

Before 1980 the literature on "childhood schizophrenia" often described a "heterogeneous mixture" of different disorders, such as autism, "symbiotic psychosis" or psychotic disorder other than schizophrenia, pervasive developmental disorders and dementia infantilis.
