= Visual processing abnormalities in schizophrenia =

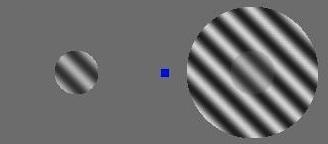
Fig.1 Surround Suppression Demo. With eyes fixed on the blue square, the center of the circle on the right appears to be lower contrast than the circle on the left, even though they are physically identical.

Visual processing abnormalities in schizophrenia are commonly found, and contribute to poor social function.

There is evidence that schizophrenia affects perception of contrast and motion, control of eye movements, detection of visual contours, and recognition of faces or facial expressions. The specificity of many visual processing abnormalities in schizophrenia is still an area of active debate within the scientific community.

== Perception of contrast ==
=== Contrast sensitivity ===
Contrast is a feature of visual stimuli that characterizes the difference in brightness between dark and light regions of an image. Perception of contrast is affected by the temporal frequency and spatial frequency properties of a stimulus, and the sensitivity to contrast in sine wave stimuli is characterized by the contrast sensitivity function. Contrast sensitivity has been shown to be impaired in schizophrenia. There is evidence that these impairments may be more severe among people with predominantly negative symptoms, or those who are not medicated. Butler and colleagues have proposed that people with schizophrenia may have a specific deficit in the magnocellular visual processing pathway, and electroencephalography (EEG) data have been presented that may support this view. Results from pharmacological studies in cats have demonstrated the role of NMDA in contrast perception of magnocellular-tuned stimuli. Application of drugs that deactivate this glutamate receptor type led to reduced neural responses in the visual system of cats, and some argue this suppression is similar to the reduced behavioral responses observed among people with schizophrenia. They claim these results are consistent with the glutamate hypothesis of schizophrenia, which proposes that dysfunction in this neurotransmitter system leads to abnormal neural activity underlying this disorder. Skottun and colleagues dispute the magnocellular deficit theory however, saying that there is not enough evidence from different research groups to support it, and that the experiments focused on this topic have shown very mixed results.

=== Surround suppression ===
The perceived contrast of a stimulus is sometimes suppressed when another stimulus is presented surrounding it, an effect known as surround suppression (see Figure 1), which is similar to the simultaneous contrast illusion. In schizophrenia, estimations of perceived contrast in surround suppression are less suppressed than for healthy adults. Further, the magnitude of this perceptual suppression effect has been shown to correlate with the concentration of GABA (γ-aminobutyric acid), an inhibitory neurotransmitter, in the visual cortex. These results may illustrate the role of GABA in mechanisms that regulate the overall level of neural activity in visual cortex, and it has been suggested that such mechanisms may be disrupted in schizophrenia. Such a disruption would be consistent with the GABA hypothesis of schizophrenia, which states that dysfunctional GABAergic inhibition may disrupt neural activity in subjects with this disorder, and this in turn may lead to visual processing abnormalities.

== Motion processing ==
Motion perception is an important visual function and occurs from the earliest stages of cortical visual processing, with individual neurons being tuned to a preferred direction of motion. The cortical area MT (medial temporal cortex, also known as V5) plays a significant role in motion processing, and deactivation of this region using Transcranial magnetic stimulation can affect perception of motion. Subjects with schizophrenia have shown abnormalities in perceptual judgments of motion, speed and direction, with deficits in these judgments generally being reported. It has been suggested that these findings are related to the aforementioned magnocellular deficit purported to exist in this disorder. Inhibition of motion perception by the addition of a surround stimulus has also been examined in schizophrenia, with one group finding evidence both of impaired motion perception and weaker perceptual suppression effects in schizophrenia. This agrees with the findings mentioned previously related to weaker suppression of perceived contrast in this disorder. However, another recent report has disputed this finding, instead showing evidence consistent with stronger surround influence on motion perception in schizophrenia.

== Eye movements ==
Eye movements are important behaviors for locating and tracking objects in the visual world. Two of the major types of eye movements are saccades and smooth pursuit. Saccades are very rapid and precise eye movements between two positions, and are important in establishing fixation. Smooth pursuit on the other hand, allows the viewer to track a moving object along its trajectory within the visual field. Deficits in eye movement behavior among people with schizophrenia have been reported since the beginning of the 20th century. Genetic factors are believed to be involved in these abnormalities, as unaffected relatives show similar dysfunction. Specifically, saccade abnormalities have been observed in this disorder, with people showing changes in saccade rate, amplitude and accuracy. Such deficits have been linked to medication with lithium, as well as to damage in frontal lobe regions. Further, people with schizophrenia often exhibit errors in smooth pursuit eye movements. The neural correlates of smooth pursuit behavior in schizophrenia have been studied using functional Magnetic Resonance Imaging (fMRI), with abnormal activation having been observed in multiple cortical regions implicated in motion processing, such as Frontal Eye Fields and area MT. Some have speculated that errors in smooth pursuit in this disorder may depend on deficits in frontal lobe processing, such as errors in anticipating the direction of stimulus motion, and that this in turn may be consistent with working memory deficits in schizophrenia. Others have disputed this claim, presenting evidence instead pointing to the aforementioned deficits in motion processing, and abnormalities in cortical area MT as a possible source of smooth pursuit errors. In this experiment, it was found that motion perception and smooth pursuit task performance were correlated, but no relationship between measures of smooth pursuit and attention was observed.

== Contour detection ==
Detecting visual contours, edges, or boundaries is an important function in human and computer vision which facilitates figure-ground segmentation and object recognition. Contour integration depends on a subject's ability to link representations of separate visual stimuli into a coherent percept. Subjects with schizophrenia have been shown to perform worse than healthy adults on tasks that depend on contour integration, and these deficits may be related to factors such as illness severity, chronicity, and degree of disorganized symptoms. In these experiments, subjects often viewed stimuli that could be connected to form a coherent perception of a line, like a simplified connect the dots puzzle. In general, the magnitude of visual processing abnormalities (such as abnormal contour detection performance) in schizophrenia are fairly small. Therefore, it may be necessary to examine experimental data from a large number of subjects in order to observe difference between healthy adults and those with schizophrenia using statistical methods. It has been proposed that weaker lateral excitation due to deficient NMDA-receptor functioning could disrupt neural processing, and that this might underlie problems with contour integration in schizophrenia. This idea is consistent with the glutamate hypothesis of schizophrenia, as dysfunction in this neurotransmitter system may explain the symptoms observed.

Presentation of collinear stimuli flanking a target can enhance responses to the target in cortex, an effect known as flanker or collinear facilitation, which has been shown to be weaker in those with schizophrenia than in unaffected adults or those with bipolar disorder. Publications from multiple research groups indicate that those with schizophrenia perform more poorly than healthy adults when asked to identify contours composed of separated line segments embedded in backgrounds made up of randomly oriented segments. This includes evidence from an fMRI experiment indicating abnormally reduced activation in visual areas V2-4. Another group used EEG to examine illusory contour processing deficits in schizophrenia. They found decreased amplitude and altered source location for the P1 component in patients, which they claim reflects abnormal dorsal stream processing in this disorder.

== Crowding phenomenon ==
Crowding refers to the phenomenon where recognition of visual stimuli presented in the periphery is impaired by the presence of other nearby objects (sometimes called "flankers"). Abnormal crowding has been observed in schizophrenia, with different groups reporting stronger or weaker crowding effects.

== Gaze shifts ==
During gaze shifts, for example when an object appears in the periphery, humans usually move both their eyes and head to capture the object of interest. In experiments, in which participants needed to shift their gaze to detect a visual target, people with schizophrenia exhibit abnormal eye-head coordination, and no modulation of saccadic latency (the delay between onset of the stimulus in the periphery and the start of the gaze shift) occurred, which is usually task dependent in healthy controls as they adjust to different task in terms of saccadic latency.

== Perception of faces and facial emotions ==
=== Faces ===
Face perception is a function of the visual system which is critical for social behavior. People with schizophrenia have shown abnormalities in tasks designed to probe facial processing and recognition. Specifically, performance deficits have been observed in this disorder when subjects were asked to identify degraded pictures of faces, and the deficits observed were specific to those with predominantly disorganized symptoms. Another experiment using the same stimuli during EEG found poorer performance and slower reaction times among those with schizophrenia, as well as abnormalities in beta band activity. The authors state that these results are related to deficits in long range coordination of neural activity, as described for contour detection. Another experiment using EEG and structural MRI to examine facial processing abnormalities in schizophrenia found decreased N170 component responses, and this was correlated with decreased gray matter volumes in the fusiform gyrus. There is evidence that the fusiform face area is a visual cortical region that may be specialized for detecting faces. The authors of this study conclude that their data support a specific face processing deficit in schizophrenia. However, another study using fractured images of faces found that people with schizophrenia were better than healthy adults at identifying images of famous people that had been distorted. These experiments state that this may be evidence of weaker "configural" processing in schizophrenia, who instead may rely more on local image features for face identification, as these were preserved in their image manipulation.

=== Facial emotions ===
Recognizing emotional expressions in images of human faces is a particularly important component of face perception with clear implications in human social interactions. People with schizophrenia reportedly perform poorly compared with healthy adults when asked to identify facial emotions. Some researchers have claimed that this is not a deficit specific to facial emotion perception per se, but rather evidence of a generalized deficit or overall poorer task performance in schizophrenia. However, others have argued that a review of the literature shows evidence of an additional specific deficit in processing negative emotions, such as anger and fear, among those with schizophrenia. In addition, evidence has been presented of a link between a specific emotion processing deficit in schizophrenia and the volume of temporal lobe structures, including fusiform gyrus and middle temporal gyrus, as measured using MRI.

== Visual backward masking ==
In visual backward masking (VBM) a briefly presented target is followed by a mask, which decreases performance on the target. VBM is a powerful experiment for schizophrenia research. It allows for control over timing at millisecond level, there are well-supported theories of the underlying mechanisms, and it can be easily studied using EEG and fMRI. Not only patients but also their unaffected siblings show strong and reproducible masking deficits, thus masking deficits have been suggested as an endophenotype for schizophrenia.

== Trigger hypothesis ==
In the early stages of the disease, and in untreated patients, hypersensitivity to low spatial frequencies has been documented. During the further course (and medication) of schizophrenia, this hypersensitivity turns into hyposensitivity and begins to affect other spatial frequencies of visual perception. Alterations to the visual signal, which are largely inconsistent over the course of schizophrenia (remission and relapse phases), may lead to the formation of inconsistent internal models of the world. These signal alterations (noise-to-signal ratios) are associated with fluctuations in Dopamine and Acetylcholine levels, decreased activity of inhibitory GABAergic interneurons, and hypofunction of NMDAr associated with gradual loss of cell populations in the precortical visual circuit. The volatile and noisy signal from the visual periphery may then act as an amplifier of primarily decreased connectivity within frontal areas, which may then prograde retrogradely to lower cortical areas of the visual information processing circuit.

== See also ==
- Causes of schizophrenia
- Diagnosis of schizophrenia
- Visual perception
- Visual system
