= Post-schizophrenic depression =

- Specialty: Psychiatry

Post-schizophrenic depression is a "depressive episode arising in the aftermath of a schizophrenic illness where some low-level schizophrenic symptoms may still be present." Someone that has post-schizophrenic depression experiences both symptoms of depression and can also continue showing mild symptoms of schizophrenia. Unfortunately, depression is a common symptom found in patients with schizophrenia and can fly under the radar for years before others become aware of its presence in a patient. However, very little research has been done on the subject, meaning there are few answers to how it should be systematically diagnosed, treated, or what course the illness will take. Some scientists would entirely deny the existence of post-schizophrenic depression, insisting it is a phase in schizophrenia as a whole. As of late, post-schizophrenic depression has become officially recognized as a syndrome and is considered a sub-type of schizophrenia.

== Symptoms ==
Because the nature of acute schizophrenia is similar to depression, it is difficult to differentiate normal levels of depression in patients with schizophrenia from depressive levels in post-schizophrenic depression. "Prominent subjectively low mood, suggesting depression, and prominent blunting of affect, suggesting negative symptoms, are the two features which are most helpful in differentiating [schizophrenia and depression]." A number of researchers believe that depression is actually a symptom of schizophrenia that has been hidden by the psychosis. However, symptoms usually arise after the first psychotic episodes if they will arise at all. Officially, diagnosing post-schizophrenia depression in a patient requires for the patient to be experiencing a depressive episode of either short or long term following the overcoming of schizophrenia. The patient must still demonstrate some schizophrenic symptoms but those symptoms must no longer be the focus of the illness. Typically, the depressive symptoms are not severe enough to be classified as a severe depressive episode. Formally, diagnosis entails the patient having had schizophrenia within the past year, a number of schizophrenic symptoms, and depression being present for two weeks or more. Mild schizophrenic signs may be withdrawing socially, agitation or hostility, and irregular sleep such as in the case of insomnia and hypersomnia.

== Causes ==
There is no clear cause to how certain patients with schizophrenia develop post-schizophrenic depression while others may surpass this stage. However, there are a few theories as to possible causes. Those with post-schizophrenic depression often experience social isolation due to their illness, which may increase depression levels. There is strong evidence of stigma-related isolation against those with mental illnesses in a variety of societies, especially those with schizophrenia as they are often viewed as dangerous and unpredictable. Because of this isolation and studies linking social isolation and depression, it is possible that patients under these stigmas eventually develop post-schizophrenic depression. Depression in patients with schizophrenia may also be caused by substance abuse, which is fairly common among those with schizophrenia, as depressants such as alcohol and cannabis can be relaxing. Furthermore, with what little information is currently known about post-schizophrenic depression, the onset may be caused by not giving patients with schizophrenia antipsychotic medications. After being taken off of antipsychotic medication, schizophrenic patients' antidepressant medication had to be increased, while those under antipsychotic medication reported having fewer depressive symptoms, further giving reason to believe that a lack of antipsychotic medication in earlier stages of schizophrenia may lead to post-schizophrenic depression. However, some psychology professionals still push for the reduction of neuroleptic drugs, as there is a popular belief that post-schizophrenic depression is caused by neuroleptic treatment. Therapists are also believed to engage the depression in people with schizophrenia, having given too much psychotherapy after the patient had overcome their schizophrenic symptoms. Schizophrenia itself should not be overlooked as a key player in causing post-schizophrenic depression, though. A study done over a two-year time period shadowing patients with schizophrenia and monitoring their depression was unable to locate possible triggers such as the ones previously listed, so it is possible the nature of schizophrenia itself is the primary cause of post-schizophrenic depression.

== Suicide ==
Those with post-schizophrenic depression are also commonly at risk for suicidal tendencies. There is a trend correlated between suicide and post-schizophrenic depression according to Mulholland and Cooper's research in "The Symptoms of Depression in Schizophrenia and its Management." Furthermore, depression and schizophrenia have both been studied individually to try to determine if there is a correlation, and research has indicated that there is a very strong tendency for people with depression or schizophrenia to attempt suicide. Statistically, out of all patients with schizophrenia, "10%...commit suicide. Depressed patients with schizophrenia are at a particularly high risk for suicide the first few months after diagnosis and after hospital discharge." Risk factors increasing the chance of suicide are, from highest to lowest, previous depressive orders, previous suicide attempts, drug abuse, and several other factors. Surprisingly, the suicide risk actually decreased with the presence of hallucinations. The ICD-10 Classification of Mental and Behavioural Disorders officially recognizes suicide as being a prominent aspect of post-schizophrenic depression. Because of this drastic increase in suicide, it can be difficult to study post-schizophrenic depression as many of those affected take their own lives.

== Treatment ==
For a number of years, scholars debated amongst themselves whether or not antipsychotic drugs had a tendency to increase depression or simply help the patient manage their mental illness. However, conclusive evidence points to antipsychotic drugs actually helping patients with their depression while simultaneously assisting in the suppression of schizophrenic episodes. Specifically risperidone, olanzapine, quetiapine, fluphenazine, haloperidol, and L-sulpiride have done the best in drug trials pertaining to people with schizophrenia. Along with antipsychotic drugs, post-schizophrenic patients may receive antidepressants to actively treat the depression. Drugs are certainly not the only answer, though. At the base of both depression and schizophrenia, social withdrawal is a shared symptom between the two. People with schizophrenia require a strong support system to be healthy, just as is the case with the rest the human population. The opportunity to become a working citizen is another way to ward off depression in patients with schizophrenia, helping them create social ties and a feeling of accomplishment.
