= Functional MRI methods and findings in schizophrenia =

Functional magnetic resonance imaging (fMRI) is one of many approaches that has been used to scientifically study schizophrenia. fMRI methods have allowed researchers to combine neurocognitive testing with structural neuroanatomical measures, consider cognitive and affective paradigms, and create computer-aided diagnosis techniques and algorithms. fMRI has several benefits as a neuroimaging modality, such as its non-invasive quality, relatively high spatial resolution, and decent temporal resolution. This is due the influential development in the scanner hardware, where it now allows for technicians to retrieve higher resolution images in a shorter amount of time. Additionally, there has been an improved motion correction and harmonization, which both aid in the generalizability and replication of findings in schizophrenia research. Recent studies have used fMRI to explore specific brain networks, such as the salience network and default mode network, to understand their roles in schizophrenia-related symptoms. Alterations in these networks may affect self-referential thoughts and responses to external stimuli, potentially contributing to symptoms like hallucinations and disorganized thinking. One particular method used in recent research is resting state fMRI (rs-fMRI).

In a "reformulation" of the binary-risk vulnerability model, researchers have suggested a multiple-hit hypothesis that utilizes several risk factors — some bestowing a greater probability than others — to identify at-risk individuals, often genetically predisposed to schizophrenia. The process of defining clinical criteria of schizophrenia for early diagnosis has posed a great challenge for scientists.

== Methodology ==
According to the DSM-5, a schizophrenia diagnosis can be given if an individual possesses two or more of the following symptoms for at least a one-month period: delusions, hallucinations, disorganized speech, grossly disorganized or catatonic behavior, or negative symptoms. The symptoms present must include at least one of the following three symptoms: delusions, hallucinations, and disorganized speech. The rapidly growing body of studies on schizophrenia has covered topics such as abnormal activity in "motor tasks, working memory attention, word fluency, emotion processing, and decision making".

Researchers also focus on identifying biomarkers through fMRI scans that could aid early diagnosis. For example, abnormalities in the anterior cingulate cortex and dorsolateral prefrontal cortex are considered potential indicators of schizophrenia risk. In contrast to the abundance of research centered on positive symptoms of the disorder, fMRI research for schizophrenia primarily analyzes the 'failures' of the neural system and the resulting cognitive deficits, with an example being changes in functional connectivity. Another biomarker that can be found through fMRI scans is dysconnectivity within functioning of the cortico-striatal-thalamo-cortical networks. Because this characteristic is associated as an early signal for psychosis, it acts as a marker for predicting a schizophrenia diagnosis.

To confirm that a task activates identical regions in schizophrenia patients vs. controls, the given task typically begins easily so that both patients and healthy comparison subjects perform close to 100% accuracy; the task is then increased in difficulty to distinguish activation between two groups with varying abilities of individuals. The effects of confounding variables can be mitigated by matching participants with schizophrenia with healthy control participants, based on race, age, sex, occupation, etc. Additionally, increasing the number of participants in datasets helps statistical and machine learning algorithms accurately detect differences between patients and controls.

=== The 'basic symptoms' approach ===
The "basic symptoms" approach to understanding schizophrenia, which emerged from "retrospective descriptions of the prodromal phase", provides a framework for a large portion of fMRI research on the topic, which evaluates changes in cognition and sensory perception that may affect higher-level information processes. The word basic refers to the earliest stages of the self-experienced symptoms of psychosis. These symptoms overall reveal the expression of neurobiological presses relating to it. This acts as an indicator for the onset of schizophrenia, and has potential in alerting researchers in earlier treatment. Moreover, researchers oppose the tendency of researchers to attribute schizophrenia to higher-order processes like working memory, attention, and executive processing, instead choosing to inspect impairments in basic sensory and perceptual functions. Deficits in basic sensory functions influence higher-order processes such as auditory emotion recognition, perceptual closure, object recognition, etc. New research also suggests that disruptions in basic visual and auditory processing could contribute to impaired social perception in schizophrenia, making it difficult for individuals to interpret body language and facial expressions accurately. In the visual system, for example, rudimentary deficits in the function of the magnocellular system result in impairments in higher-order processes like perceptual closure, object recognition, and reading. On the other hand, fMRI data has also suggested the opposite. In one study, researchers found significantly differing activity between healthy and schizophrenic patients in the left dorsal parietal cortex and left ventrolateral prefrontal cortex; as these regions are essential components of a frontal-parietal executive system, hypo-activity in these regions for schizophrenia patients during working memory tasks were theorized to be associated with deficits in executive functioning.

== Resting-state fMRI ==
The 'disconnectivity hypothesis' is a key theory describing the failure of mechanisms underlying schizophrenia, specifically the failure to integrate information properly. The dysconnectivity hypothesis suggests that disruptions in communication between the brain's frontal and temporal regions may underlie symptoms like auditory hallucinations and impaired memory, as these areas are critical for integrating sensory input and memory. Functional connectivity, which fMRI evaluates, is the activity coordination between brain regions. It is measured as "temporal correlations of low-frequency oscillations in the BOLD signal between anatomically distinct brain areas" and can reveal resting state networks. The cause for the correlations in fMRI measurements is theorized to be "correlated firing rates of interconnected neurons." Resting-state functional magnetic resonance imaging (rs-fMRI) has become a powerful tool to examine networks' functional connectivity throughout the brain, such as the default mode network (DMN). Through resting-state fMRI, scientists have observed that schizophrenia is associated with altered connectivity patterns in the default mode, central executive, and salience networks. These networks' dysconnectivity could impact attention, emotion regulation, and self-referential thought processes. Although there are benefits to the resting state fMRI, fMRI scans measures the blood oxygen level-dependent response (BOLD) when patients partake in specific tasks. Therefore, when a brain region is activated, it takes in more oxygen, which measures and differentiates activity in various neurotransmitter systems. Failure to achieve this causes ambiguity in the areas that are affected, leaving researchers to only see general areas for treatment.

Abnormal brain connectivity has long been theorized as a fundamental cause of psychosis in schizophrenia. rs-fMRI can help evaluate regional interactions at rest and whether there are altered, reduced, or hyperactive connections in psychiatric disorders like schizophrenia. During resting-state fMRI experiments, participants are instructed to relax and stay awake but not think of anything. Resting-state networks can change between eyes open and eyes closed conditions. Researchers then measure spontaneous brain activation. There are several advantages to studying the resting state of brain networks — the primary reason is that spontaneous neural activity accounts for most of the brain's activity in contrast to task-based neural activity. Additionally, rs-fMRI eliminates confounding effects such as differing performances between healthy subjects and patients in tasks; rs-fMRI also requires less movement than task-based fMRI studies. Seed-based analysis/ROI approaches to analyzing functional connectivity are common in rs-fMRI for schizophrenia. A seed (region of interest) is first selected, and BOLD time series are then extracted from the seed and all other voxels. After preprocessing, the temporal correlation between the seed and other brain voxels is determined, and the software produces a functional connectivity map. Seed-based comparisons in rs-fMRI have revealed functional disconnectivity in schizophrenia patients in numerous studies, using different ROIs for their seeds — in general, schizophrenia patients show reduced connectivity. Recent studies using resting-state fMRI (rs-fMRI) have identified significant disruptions in functional connectivity across multiple brain networks in schizophrenia, including the default mode, frontotemporal, and cerebellar networks. These findings provide additional support for the dysconnectivity hypothesis, which suggests that impaired coordination between brain regions contributes to the cognitive and behavioral symptoms of schizophrenia. This information is compatible with experiment findings suggesting reduced activation in the amygdala in schizophrenia patients during sadness mood induction, for example.
