= Brief psychotic disorder =

- Specialty: Clinical psychology, psychiatry

Brief psychotic disorder is a psychotic condition involving the sudden onset of at least one psychotic symptom (such as disorganized thought/speech, delusions, hallucinations, or grossly disorganized or catatonic behavior) lasting 1 day to 1 month, often accompanied by emotional turmoil. Remission of all symptoms is complete with patients returning to the previous level of functioning. It may follow a period of extreme stress including the loss of a loved one. Most patients with this condition under DSM-5 would be classified as having acute and transient psychotic disorders under ICD-10. Prior to DSM-IV, this condition was called "brief reactive psychosis." This condition may or may not be recurrent, and it should not be caused by another condition.

The term bouffée délirante describes an acute non-affective and non-schizophrenic psychotic disorder, which is largely similar to DSM-III-R and DSM-IV brief psychotic and schizophreniform disorders.

== Presentation ==
Brief psychotic disorder is characterized by a sudden onset of psychotic symptoms, which may include delusions, hallucinations, disorganized speech or behavior, or catatonic behavior.

Symptoms generally last at least a day, but not more than a month, and there is an eventual return to full baseline functioning. Brief psychotic disorder may occur in response to a significant stressor in one's life, or in other situations where a stressor is not apparent, including in the weeks following giving birth.

In diagnosis, a careful distinction is considered for culturally appropriate behaviors, such as religious beliefs and activities. It is believed to be connected to or synonymous with a variety of culture-specific phenomena such as latah, koro, and amok.

=== Classification ===
There are three forms of brief psychotic disorder:

- Brief psychotic disorder with a marked stressor (a.k.a. brief reactive psychosis): if brief psychotic disorder symptoms occur in following personal events (single or multiple) that would be expected to cause significant stress to an average individual.
- Brief psychotic disorder without a marked stressor: if brief psychotic disorder symptoms do not occur in following personal events (single or multiple) that would be expected to cause significant stress to an average individual.
- Brief psychotic disorder with postpartum onset: if onset of brief psychotic disorder symptoms is during pregnancy or within 4 weeks after birth.

==== Brief psychotic disorder with a marked stressor (brief reactive psychosis) ====
Brief reactive psychosis (designated since the DSM IV-TR as "brief psychotic disorder with marked stressor(s), BRP"), is the psychiatric term for psychosis which can be triggered by an extremely stressful event in the life of an individual and eventually yielding to a return to normal functioning.

Brief reactive psychosis generally follows a recognisably traumatic life event like divorce or homelessness, but may be triggered by any subjective experience which appears catastrophic to the person affected. Among such stressors are the death of a loved one, professional loss such as unexpectedly losing one's job or otherwise becoming unemployed, or serious adverse changes in the patient's personal life, such as the breakdown of their family through divorce, etc. It must be emphasised that this is by no means an exhaustive list of stressful life events, because the events which trigger brief reactive psychosis tend, due to the individualistic nature of human psychology, to be extremely personalized. BRP may be the first breakdown for someone with a chronic psychiatric disorder but only time will tell whether the disorder will be brief or lifelong, whether BRP or a chronic condition that is controlled well enough by medication that symptoms do not return.

The condition usually resolves spontaneously within a time span of weeks to months, with the severity of the symptoms reducing continuously over the period in question. A primary goal of treatment is to prevent patients who are either suicidal or homicidal from harming themselves or others during the episode.

== Causes ==
The exact cause of brief psychotic disorder is not known. One theory suggests a genetic link, because the disorder is more common in people who have family members with mood disorders, such as depression or bipolar disorder. Another theory suggests that the disorder is caused by poor coping skills, as a defense against or escape from a particularly frightening or stressful situation. These factors may create a vulnerability to develop brief psychotic disorder. In most cases, the disorder is triggered by a major stress or traumatic event.

In females, a low estrogen state (which may occur premenstrual, postpartum, or perimenopausal) can trigger sudden, short-lived psychosis. The psychosis is often linked to an underlying bipolar or schizophrenic condition. Such psychosis (when diagnosed as such), is often considered "premenstrual exacerbation" or "menstrual psychosis", or postpartum psychosis. Childbirth may trigger the disorder in some women. Approximately 1 in 10,000 women experience brief psychotic disorder shortly after childbirth.

== Diagnosis ==
The symptoms must not be caused by schizophrenia, schizoaffective disorder, delusional disorder, or mania in bipolar disorder. They must also not be caused by a drug (such as amphetamines) or medical condition (such as a brain tumor).

=== Differential diagnosis ===
There are general medical causes of brief psychosis that should be considered during evaluation, including postnatal depression, HIV and AIDS, malaria, syphilis, Alzheimer's disease, Parkinson's disease, hypoglycaemia (an abnormally low level of glucose in the blood), lupus, multiple sclerosis, brain tumor, SARS-CoV-2 (COVID-19) infection and pediatric autoimmune neuropsychiatric disorders (PANS).

== Epidemiology ==
The exact incidence and prevalence of brief psychotic disorder is not known, but it is generally considered uncommon. Internationally, it occurs twice as often in women than men, and even more often in women in the United States. It typically occurs in the late 30s and early 40s. Approximately 1 in 10,000 women experience brief psychotic disorder shortly after childbirth.

== History ==
Otto Fenichel noted how such short psychotic breaks were more common in World War II than in World War I, in the wake of traumatic shocks: he considered in such cases that "enough preconscious attention remains to re-establish the contact with reality as soon as it becomes bearable again".

== In media ==
Brief psychotic disorder and its symptoms were featured in the Kevin Spacey and Daniel Wu-starring film Inseparable. Daniel Wu's character developed brief psychotic disorder after a series of tragedies.

== See also ==
- Bouffée délirante
- Menstrual psychosis
- Mental breakdown
- Schizophreniform disorder
