= Risk factors of schizophrenia =

Risk factors related to schizophrenia

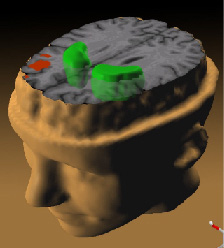
Schizophrenia PET scan.

Schizophrenia is a neurodevelopmental disorder with no precise or single cause. Schizophrenia is thought to arise from multiple mechanisms and complex gene–environment interactions with vulnerability factors. Risk factors of schizophrenia have been identified and include genetic factors, environmental factors such as experiences in life and exposures in a person's environment, and also the function of a person's brain as it develops. The interactions of these risk factors are intricate, as numerous and diverse medical insults from conception to adulthood can be involved. Many theories have been proposed including the combination of genetic and environmental factors may lead to deficits in the neural circuits that affect sensory input and cognitive functions.

A genetic predisposition on its own, without superimposed environmental risk factors, is not thought to give rise to schizophrenia. Environmental risk factors are many, and include pregnancy complications, prenatal stress and nutrition, and adverse childhood experiences. An environmental risk factor may act alone or in combination with others.

Schizophrenia typically develops between the ages of 16–30 (generally males aged 16–25 years and females 25–30 years); about 75 percent of people living with the illness developed it in these age-ranges. Childhood schizophrenia (very early onset schizophrenia) develops before the age of 13 years and is quite rare. On average there is a somewhat earlier onset for men than women, with the possible influence of the female sex hormone estrogen being one hypothesis and socio-cultural influences another. Estrogen seems to have a dampening effect on dopamine receptors.

== Gene-environment interaction ==
Evidence suggests that it is the interaction between genes and the environment that may be associated with the development of schizophrenia. This is a complex process involving multiple environmental factors that have influence on a range of developmental periods that interact with a genetic susceptibility. It has been suggested that apart from gene-environment interactions, environment-environment interactions also be taken into account as each environmental risk factor on its own is not enough to promote the development of schizophrenia.

A meta-analysis was performed to determine the association between schizophrenia and oxidative DNA damage measured by 8-hydroxy-2'-8-deoxyguanosine (8-OHdG) or 8-oxo-7,8-dihydro-2'-deoxyguanosine (8-oxodG). Levels of 8-OHdG and 8-oxodG are widely used as measures of oxidative stress in mental illnesses including schizophrenia. It was determined from this meta-analysis that oxidative DNA damage was significantly increased in schizophrenia.

== Genetics ==
Schizophrenia is thought to have a heritable component in some people, but many people who appear to carry schizophrenia-associated genes may not develop the disease. Research has shown that schizophrenia is a polygenic disorder and that genetic vulnerability to schizophrenia is highly multifactorial, caused by the interactions of several genes with environmental risk factors. Twin studies have shown that an identical twin has ~50% risk of also developing the disorder.

Family studies indicate that the closer a person's genetic relatedness to a person with schizophrenia, the greater the likelihood of developing the disorder. Paternal age may be a factor in schizophrenia because of the increased likelihood of mutations in the chromosomes of cells that produce sperm. In contrast, women's oocytes divide twenty-three times before the time of birth. The chance of a copying error in DNA replication during cell division increases with the number of cell divisions, and an increase in copying errors may cause an accumulation of mutations that are responsible for an increased incidence of schizophrenia. The average concordance rates are higher for identical twins than for fraternal twins and evidence also suggests that the prenatal and perinatal environments may also affect concordance rates in identical twins.

=== Genetic candidates ===
Although twin studies and family studies have indicated a large degree of heritability for schizophrenia, the exact genetic causes remain unclear. However, some large-scale studies have begun to unravel the genetic underpinnings for the disease. Important segregation should be made between lower risk, common variants (identified by candidate studies or genome-wide association studies) and high risk, rare variants (which could be caused by de novo mutations) and copy-number variations (CNVs).

=== Candidate gene studies ===
A 2003 review of linkage studies also listed seven genes as likely to increase risk for a later diagnosis of the disorder. Two reviews suggested that the evidence was strongest for two genes known as dysbindin (DTNBP1) and neuregulin (NRG1), and that a number of other genes (such as COMT, RGS4, PPP3CC, ZDHHC8, DISC1, and AKT1) showed some early promising results. Knockout studies in Drosophila show that reduced expression of dysbindin reduced glutamatergic synaptic transmission, resulting in impaired memory. Variations near the gene FXYD6 have also been associated with schizophrenia in the UK but not in Japan. In 2008, rs7341475 single nucleotide polymorphism (SNP) of the reelin gene was associated with an increased risk of schizophrenia in women, but not in men. This female-specific association was replicated in several populations. Studies have found evidence that the protein phosphatase 3 known as calcineurin might be involved in susceptibility to schizophrenia.

The largest most comprehensive genetic study of its kind, involving tests of several hundred single-nucleotide polymorphisms (SNPs) in nearly 1,900 individuals with schizophrenia or schizoaffective disorder and 2,000 comparison subjects, reported in 2008 that there was no evidence of any significant association between the disorders and any of 14 previously identified candidate genes (RGS4, DISC1, DTNBP1, STX7, TAAR6, PPP3CC, NRG1, DRD2, HTR2A, DAOA, AKT1, CHRNA7, COMT, and ARVCF). The statistical distributions suggested nothing more than chance variation. The authors concluded that the findings make it unlikely that common SNPs in these genes account for a substantial proportion of the genetic risk for schizophrenia, although small effects could not be ruled out.

The perhaps largest analysis of genetic associations in schizophrenia is with the SzGene database at the Schizophrenia Research Forum. One 2008 meta-analysis examined genetic variants in 16 genes and found nominally significant effects.

A 2009 study was able to create mice matching symptoms of schizophrenia by the deletion of only one gene set, those of the neuregulin post-synaptic receptor. The result showed that although the mice mostly developed normally, on further brain development, glutamate receptors broke down. This theory supports the glutamate hypothesis of schizophrenia. Another study in 2009 by Simon Fraser University researchers identifies a link between autism and schizophrenia: "The SFU group found that variations in four sets of genes are related to both autism and schizophrenia. People normally have two copies of each gene, but in those people with autism some genome locations have only single copies, and in those with schizophrenia extra copies are present at the same locations."

=== Genome-wide association studies ===
To increase sample size for a better powered detection of common variants with small effects, data from genome-wide association studies (GWAS) is continuing to be clustered in large international consortia. The Psychiatric Genomics Consortium (PGC) attempts to aggregate GWAS data on schizophrenia to detect associations of common variants with small effect on disease risk.

In 2011, this collaboration identified by meta-analysis of genome-wide association studies that 129 single-nucleotide polymorphism (SNP) significantly associated with schizophrenia were located in major histocompatibility complex region of the genome.

In 2013 this dataset was expanded to identify in total 13 candidate loci for the disease, and also implicated calcium signaling as an important factor in the disease.

In 2014 this collaboration expanded to an even larger meta-analysis, the largest to date, on GWAS data (36,989 cases and 113,075 controls) in Nature, indicating 108 schizophrenia-associated genetic loci, of which 83 have not been previously described. Together, these candidate genes pointed to an importance of neurotransmission and immunology as important factors in the disease.

Distinct symptomatic subtypes of schizophrenia groups showed to have a different pattern of SNP variations, reflecting the heterogeneous nature of the disease.

A 2016 study implicated the C4A gene in schizophrenia risk. C4A was found to play a role in synaptic pruning, and increased C4A expression leads to reduced dendritic spines and a higher schizophrenia risk.

=== Copy number variations ===
Other research has suggested that a greater than average number of structural variations such as rare deletions or duplications of tiny DNA sequences within genes (known as copy number variations) are linked to increased risk for schizophrenia, especially in "sporadic" cases not linked to family history of schizophrenia, and that the genetic factors and developmental pathways can thus be different in different individuals. A genome wide survey of 3,391 individuals with schizophrenia found CNVs in less than 1% of cases. Within them, deletions in regions related to psychosis were observed, as well as deletions on chromosome 15q13.3 and 1q21.1.

CNVs occur due to non-allelic homologous recombination mediated by low copy repeats (sequentially similar regions). This results in deletions and duplications of dosage sensitive genes. It has been speculated that CNVs underlie a significant proportion of normal human variation, including differences in cognitive, behavioral, and psychological features, and that CNVs in at least three loci can result in increased risk for schizophrenia in a few individuals. One such CNV is found in DiGeorge syndrome, which carries a 25-30% lifetime risk of schizophrenia. Epigenetics may also play a role in schizophrenia, with the expression of Protocadherin 11 X-linked/Protocadherin 11 Y-linked playing a possible role in schizophrenia.

A 2008 investigation of 2,977 schizophrenia patients and 33,746 controls from seven European populations examined CNVs in neurexins, and found that exon-affecting deletions in the NRXN1 gene conferred risk of schizophrenia.

An updated meta-analysis on CNVs for schizophrenia published in 2015 expanded the number of CNVs indicated in the disease, which was also the first genetic evidence for the involvement of GABAergic neurotransmission. This study further supported genetic involvement for excitatory neurotransmission.

=== Overlap with other disorders ===
Several studies have suggested a genetic overlap and possible genetic correlation between schizophrenia and other psychiatric disorders including autism spectrum disorder, attention deficit hyperactivity disorder, bipolar disorder, and major depressive disorder. One genome-wide association study analyzed single-nucleotide polymorphism (SNP) data for the five disorders; four gene areas overlapped with the five disorders, two of which regulate calcium balance in the brain.

== Environment ==
Environmental risk factors include prenatal stress, pregnancy and birth complications, and adverse childhood experiences, among others. Many are associated with prenatal development, prenatal stress and nutrition, pregnancy and childbirth. Later ones include adverse childhood experiences and substance use disorders.

=== Prenatal development ===
It is well established that pregnancy complications are associated with an increased risk of the child later developing schizophrenia, although overall they constitute a non-specific risk factor with a very small effect. That said, the first and only experimental proof that schizophrenia neuropathology definitively originates from multiple causes within human tissue has originated from prenatal developing neural tissue generated from patient stem cells, therefore establishing prenatal development as a poorly understood but important window of risk. Obstetric complications occur in approximately 25 to 30% of the general population and the vast majority do not develop schizophrenia; likewise the majority of individuals with schizophrenia have not had an identifiable obstetric event. Nevertheless, the increased average risk is replicable, and such events may moderate the effects of genetic or other environmental risk factors. The specific complications or events most linked to schizophrenia, and the mechanisms of their effects, are still under examination.

There is some evidence that exposure to toxins such as lead can also increase the risk of schizophrenia spectrum disorders.

Advanced paternal age has also been associated with increased schizophrenia risk, possibly due to the accumulation of de novo mutations in sperm that affect early neurodevelopment.

One epidemiological finding is that people diagnosed with schizophrenia are more likely to have been born in winter or spring (at least in the Northern Hemisphere). This has been termed the seasonality effect, however, the effect is small. Explanations have included a greater prevalence of viral infections at that time, or a greater likelihood of vitamin D deficiency. A similar effect (increased likelihood of being born in winter and spring) has also been found with other, healthy populations, such as chess players.

Many women who were pregnant during the Dutch famine of 1944, became malnourished, and many of their children later developed schizophrenia. Studies of Finnish mothers who were pregnant when they learned their husbands were killed during the Winter War of 1939–1940 had children who were significantly more likely to develop schizophrenia when compared with mothers who learned about their husbands' deaths after childbirth, suggesting that prenatal stress may have an effect as well.

=== Fetal growth ===
Lower than average birth weight has been one of the most consistent findings, indicating slowed fetal growth possibly mediated by genetic effects. In the first and only prospective study of the low birthweight, schizophrenia, and enlargement of brain ventricles suggestive of cerebral atrophy, Leigh Silverton and colleagues found that low birthweight (measured prospectively with regard to psychopathology) was associated with enlarged ventricles on CT scans in a sample at risk for schizophrenia over 30 years later. These signs suggestive of cerebral atrophy were associated with schizophrenia symptoms. In a follow-up study, Silverton et al. noted an interaction between genetic risk for schizophrenia and low birthweight. The risk of enlarged ventricles on brain scan (associated with schizophrenia symptoms and biologically suggestive of Emil Kraepelin's dementia praecox) was greatly increased if the subjects had both a higher genetic load for schizophrenia and lower birthweight. The investigators suggested that in utero insults may specifically stress those with a schizophrenia diathesis, supporting a "diathesis-stress" etiological model for a subset of schizophrenia (that Kraepelin identified) with early abnormalities suggesting brain atrophy.

Some investigators have noted, however, that any factor adversely affecting the fetus will affect growth rate. Some believe that this association may not be particularly informative with regard to causation. In addition, the majority of birth cohort studies have failed to find a link between schizophrenia and low birth weight or other signs of slowed growth. The majority of studies do not measure the interaction of genetic risk with birthweight as was done in the studies by Silverton et al.

=== Hypoxia ===
It has been hypothesized since the 1970s that brain hypoxia (low oxygen levels) before, at or immediately after, birth may be a risk factor for the development of schizophrenia.

Hypoxia is demonstrated as relevant to schizophrenia in animal models, molecular biology and epidemiology studies. One study was able to differentiate 90% of cases of schizophrenia from controls based on hypoxia and metabolism. Hypoxia has been described as one of the most important of the external factors that influence susceptibility, although studies have been mainly epidemiological. Such studies place a high degree of importance on hypoxic insult, but given the pattern of the illness in some families, they propose a genetic basis as well; stopping short of concluding that hypoxia is a sole cause on its own. Fetal hypoxia, in the presence of certain unidentified genes, has been correlated with reduced volume of the hippocampus, which is in turn correlated with schizophrenia.

Although most studies have interpreted hypoxia as causing some form of neuronal dysfunction or even subtle damage, it has been suggested that the physiological hypoxia that prevails in normal embryonic and fetal development, or pathological hypoxia or ischemia, may exert an effect by regulating or dysregulating genes involved in neurodevelopment. A literature review judged that over 50% of the candidate genes for susceptibility to schizophrenia met criteria for "ischemia–hypoxia regulation or vascular expression" even though only 3.5% of all genes were estimated to be involved in hypoxia/ischemia or the vasculature.

A longitudinal study found that obstetric complications involving hypoxia were one factor associated with neurodevelopmental impairments in childhood and with the later development of schizophreniform disorders. Fetal hypoxia has been found to predict unusual movements at age 4 (but not age 7) among children who go on to develop schizophrenia, suggesting that its effects are specific to a stage of neurodevelopment. A Japanese case study of monozygotic twins discordant for schizophrenia (one has the diagnosis while the other does not) draws attention to their different weights at birth and concludes hypoxia may be the differentiating factor.

The unusual functional laterality in speech production (e.g. right hemisphere auditory processing) found in some individuals with schizophrenia could be due to aberrant neural networks established as a compensation for left temporal lobe damage induced by pre- or perinatal hypoxia. Prenatal and perinatal hypoxia appears to be important as one factor in the neurodevelopmental model, with the important implication that some forms of schizophrenia may thus be preventable.

Research on rodents seeking to understand the possible role of prenatal hypoxia in disorders such as schizophrenia has indicated that it can lead to a range of sensorimotor and learning/memory abnormalities. Impairments in motor function and coordination, evident on challenging tasks when the hypoxia was severe enough to cause brain damage, were long-lasting and described as a "hallmark of prenatal hypoxia".

Several animal studies have indicated that fetal hypoxia can affect many of the same neural substrates implicated in schizophrenia, depending on the severity and duration of the hypoxic event as well as the period of gestation, and in humans moderate or severe (but not mild) fetal hypoxia has been linked to a series of motor, language and cognitive deficits in children, regardless of genetic vulnerability to schizophrenia. One paper restated that cerebellum neurological disorders were frequently found in those with schizophrenia and speculated hypoxia may cause the subsequent cognitive dysmetria

Whereas most studies find only a modest effect of hypoxia in schizophrenia, a longitudinal study using a combination of indicators to detect possible fetal hypoxia, such as early equivalents of neurologic soft signs or obstetric complications, reported that the risk of schizophrenia and other nonaffective psychoses was "strikingly elevated" (5.75% versus 0.39%). Although objective estimates of hypoxia did not account for all cases of schizophrenia; the study revealed increasing odds of schizophrenia according to graded increase in severity of hypoxia.

=== Infections and immune system ===
A number of viral exposures during prenatal development, have been associated with an increased risk of schizophrenia. Schizophrenia is somewhat more common in those born in winter to early spring, when such infections are more common.

Influenza has long been studied as a possible factor. A 1988 study found that individuals who were exposed to the Asian flu in the second trimester were at increased risk of later developing schizophrenia. This result was corroborated by a later British study of the same pandemic, but not by a 1994 study of the pandemic in Croatia. A Japanese study also found no support for a link between schizophrenia and birth after an influenza epidemic.

Polio, measles, varicella-zoster, rubella, herpes simplex, maternal genital infections, Borna disease virus, and Toxoplasma gondii have been correlated with the later development of schizophrenia. Psychiatrists E. Fuller Torrey and R.H. Yolken have hypothesized that the latter, a common parasite in humans, contributes to some cases of schizophrenia.

In a meta-analysis of several studies, they found moderately higher levels of Toxoplasma antibodies in those with schizophrenia and possibly higher rates of prenatal or early postnatal exposure to Toxoplasma gondii, but not acute infection. However, in another study of postmortem brain tissue, the authors have reported equivocal or negative results, including no evidence of herpes virus or T. gondii involvement in schizophrenia.

There is some evidence for the role of autoimmunity in the development of some cases of schizophrenia. A statistical correlation has been reported with various autoimmune diseases and direct studies have linked dysfunctional immune activation to some of the clinical features of schizophrenia.

This is known as the pathogenic theory of schizophrenia or germ theory of schizophrenia. It is a pathogenic theory of disease in which it is thought that a proximal cause of certain cases of schizophrenia is the interaction of the developing fetus with pathogens such as viruses, or with antibodies from the mother created in response to these pathogens (in particular, Interleukin 8). Substantial research suggests that exposure to certain illnesses (e.g., influenza) in the mother of a fetus (especially at the end of the second trimester) causes defects in neural development, which may emerge as a predisposition to schizophrenia around the time of puberty or later, as the brain grows and further develops.

==== Other factors ====
There is an emerging literature on a wide range of prenatal risk factors, such as prenatal stress, intrauterine (in the womb) malnutrition, and prenatal infection. Increased paternal age has been linked to schizophrenia, possibly due to "chromosomal aberrations and mutations of the aging germline." Maternal-fetal rhesus or genotype incompatibility has also been linked, via increasing the risk of an adverse prenatal environment. Also, in mothers with schizophrenia, an increased risk has been identified via a complex interaction between maternal genotype, maternal behavior, prenatal environment and possibly medication and socioeconomic factors. References for many of these environmental risk factors have been collected in an online database.

There may be an association between non-celiac gluten sensitivity and schizophrenia in a small proportion of people, though large randomized controlled trials and epidemiological studies will be needed before such an association can be firmly established. Withdrawal of gluten from the diet is an inexpensive measure which may improve the symptoms in a small (≤3%) number of people with schizophrenia.

A meta-analysis found that high neuroticism increases the risk of psychosis and schizophrenia.

Several long-term studies found that individuals born with congenital visual impairment do not develop schizophrenia, suggesting a protective effect.

The effects of estrogen in schizophrenia have been studied in view of the association between the onset of menopause in women who develop schizophrenia at this time. Add-on estrogen therapies have been studied and evaluated for their effect on the symptoms experienced. Raloxifene as an adjunctive agent has shown positive results.

Findings have supported the hypothesis that schizophrenia is associated with alterations of the tryptophane-kynurenine metabolic pathway due to activation of specific sections of the immune system.

The relevance of some auto-antibodies that act against the NMDAR and VGKC is being studied. Current estimates suggest that between 1.5 - 6.5% of patients have these antibodies in their sera. Preliminary results have shown that these patients can be treated with immunotherapy such as IVIG or Plasma exchange and steroids, in addition to antipsychotic medication(s), which can lead to a reduction in symptoms.

=== Childhood antecedents ===
In general, the antecedents of schizophrenia are subtle and those who will go on to develop schizophrenia do not form a readily identifiable subgroup — which would lead to identification of a specific cause. Average group differences from the norm may be in the direction of superior as well as inferior performance. Overall, birth cohort studies have indicated subtle nonspecific behavioral features, some evidence for psychotic-like experiences (particularly hallucinations), and various cognitive antecedents. There have been some inconsistencies in the particular domains of functioning identified and whether they continue through childhood and whether they are specific to schizophrenia.

A prospective study found average differences across a range of developmental domains, including reaching milestones of motor development late, having more speech deficits, lower educational test results, solitary play preferences at ages 4 and 6 years, and being more socially anxious at age 13 years. Lower ratings of the mother's skills and understanding of the child at age 4 were also related.

Some of the early developmental differences were identified in the first year of life in a study in Finland, although generally related to all psychotic disorders rather than schizophrenia specifically. The early subtle motor signs persisted to some extent, showing a small link to later school performance in adolescence. An earlier Finnish study found that childhood performance of 400 individuals diagnosed with schizophrenia was significantly worse than controls on subjects involving motor co-ordination (sports and handcrafts) between ages 7 and 9, but there were no differences on academic subjects (contrary to some other IQ findings). (Patients in this age group with these symptoms were significantly less likely to progress to high school, despite academic ability.)

Symptoms of schizophrenia often appear soon after puberty, when the brain is undergoing significant maturational changes. Some investigators believe that the disease process of schizophrenia begins prenatally, remains dormant until puberty, then follows a period of neural degeneration that causes the symptoms to subsequently emerge. However, reanalysis of the data from the later Finnish study, on older children (14 to 16) in a changed school system, using narrower diagnostic criteria and with fewer cases but more controls, did not support a significant difference on sports and handicraft performance. Another study found that unusual motor coordination scores at 7 years of age were associated in adulthood with schizophrenia patients and their unaffected siblings, while unusual movements at ages 4 and 7 predicted adult schizophrenia but not unaffected sibling status.

A birth cohort study in New Zealand found that children who went on to develop schizophreniform disorder had — in addition to emotional problems and interpersonal difficulties linked to all adult psychiatric outcomes measured — significant impairments in neuromotor, receptive language, and cognitive development. A retrospective study found that adults with schizophrenia had performed better than average in artistic subjects at ages 12 and 15, and in linguistic and religious subjects at age 12, but worse than average in gymnastics at age 15.

Some small studies on offspring of individuals with schizophrenia have identified various neurobehavioral deficits, a poorer family environment and disruptive school behaviour, poor peer engagement, immaturity, or unpopularity or poorer social competence and increasing schizophrenic symptomatology emerging during adolescence.

A minority "deficit syndrome" subtype of schizophrenia is proposed to be more marked by early poor adjustment and behavioral problems, as compared to non-deficit subtypes.

There is evidence that childhood experiences of abuse or trauma are risk factors for a diagnosis of schizophrenia later in life. Some researchers reported that hallucinations and other symptoms considered characteristic of schizophrenia and psychosis were at least as strongly related to neglect and childhood abuse as many other mental health problems. The researchers concluded that there is a need for staff training in asking patients about abuse, and a need to offer appropriate psychosocial treatments to those who have been neglected and/or abused as children.

=== Substance use ===
The relationship between schizophrenia and substance use is quite complex. Most addictive substances can induce psychosis. A diagnosis of substance-induced psychosis is made if symptoms persist after drug use or intoxication has ended. A number of substance-induced psychoses have the potential to transition to schizophrenia, most notably cannabis-induced psychotic disorder.

A 2019 review found that the pooled proportion of transition from substance-induced psychosis to schizophrenia was 25% (95% CI 18%–35%), compared with 36% (95% CI 30%–43%) for "brief, atypical and not otherwise specified" psychoses. The type of substance was the primary predictor of transition to schizophrenia, with highest rates associated with cannabis (6 studies, 34%, CI 25%–46%), hallucinogens (3 studies, 26%, CI 14%–43%) and amphetamines (5 studies, 22%, CI 14%–34%). Lower rates were reported for opioid (12%), alcohol (10%) and sedative (9%) induced psychoses. Transition rates were slightly lower in older cohorts but were not affected by sex, country of study, hospital or community location, urban or rural setting, diagnostic methods, or duration of follow-up.

The rate of substance use is known to be particularly high in schizophrenia patients. One study found that 60% of people with schizophrenia were found to use substances and 37% would be diagnosable with a substance use disorder.

Longitudinal cohort studies have also suggested that frequent cannabis use, particularly during adolescence, is associated with an increased risk of developing schizophrenia and related psychotic disorders, with evidence of a dose–response relationship. Individuals with a genetic vulnerability to psychosis may be particularly sensitive to the effects of cannabis, consistent with a gene–environment interaction model.

==== Cannabis ====
There is growing evidence that cannabis use can contribute to schizophrenia. Some studies suggest that cannabis is neither a sufficient nor necessary factor in developing schizophrenia, but that cannabis may significantly increase the risk of developing schizophrenia. Nevertheless, some previous research has been criticised as it has often been unclear whether cannabis use is a cause or effect of schizophrenia. To address this issue, a review of prospective cohort studies has suggested that cannabis statistically doubles the risk of developing schizophrenia on the individual level, and may, if a causal relationship is assumed, be responsible for up to 8% of cases in the general population.

Cannabis misuse by young people is suspected of contributing to schizophrenia in later life by interfering with and distorting neurodevelopment particularly of the prefrontal cortex of the brain. An older longitudinal study, published in 1987, suggested a sixfold increase of schizophrenia risk for high consumers of cannabis (use on more than fifty occasions) in Sweden.

Cannabis use is also suspected to contribute to a hyperdopaminergic state that may contribute to schizophrenia. Compounds found in cannabis, such as THC, have been shown to increase the activity of dopamine pathways in the brain, suggesting that cannabis may exacerbate symptoms of psychosis in schizophrenia.

Despite increases in cannabis consumption in the 1960s and 1970s in western society, rates of psychotic disorders such as schizophrenia remained relatively stable over time.

==== Amphetamines and other stimulants ====
As amphetamines trigger the release of dopamine and excessive dopamine function is believed to be responsible for some symptoms of schizophrenia (known as the dopamine hypothesis of schizophrenia), amphetamines may worsen psychotic symptoms. Methamphetamine, a potent neurotoxic amphetamine derivative, in a substantial minority of regular users induces psychosis that resembles schizophrenia. For most people, this psychosis fades away within a month of abstinence but for a minority, the psychosis can become chronic. Individuals who develop a long lasting psychosis, despite abstinence from methamphetamine, more commonly have a family history of schizophrenia.

Concerns have been raised that long-term therapy with stimulants for ADHD might cause or exacerbate paranoia, schizophrenia and behavioral sensitization. Family history of mental illness does not predict the incidence of stimulant toxicosis in children with ADHD. High rates of childhood stimulant use have been noted in patients with a diagnosis of schizophrenia and bipolar disorder, independent of ADHD diagnosis. Individuals with a diagnosis of bipolar disorder or schizophrenia who were prescribed stimulants during childhood typically have a significantly earlier onset of psychosis and have a more severe clinical course. It has been suggested that this small subgroup of children who develop schizophrenia after stimulant use in childhood have an inherent genetic vulnerability to developing psychosis. In addition, amphetamines can cause a stimulant psychosis in otherwise healthy individuals; stimulant psychosis superficially resembles schizophrenia and may be misdiagnosed as such.

==== Hallucinogens ====
Drugs such as ketamine, PCP (angel dust), and LSD ("acid"), have been used to mimic schizophrenia for research purposes. Using LSD and other psychedelics as a research model has fallen out of favor, as the significant differences between the drug-induced states and the typical presentation of schizophrenia have become clearer. The dissociatives ketamine and PCP, however, are still considered to produce states that are similar; they are considered better models than stimulants since they produce both positive and negative symptoms.

==== Alcohol ====
Approximately 3% of people who are alcohol-dependent will experience psychosis during acute intoxication or withdrawal. Alcohol-related psychosis arises from distortions to neuronal membranes, gene expression, and thiamine deficiency in some cases. There is evidence that excessive alcohol use via a kindling mechanism can occasionally cause the development of chronic substance-induced psychosis that may transition to schizophrenia in predisposed individuals.

==== Tobacco use ====
People with schizophrenia tend to smoke significantly more tobacco than the general population. The rates are exceptionally high amongst institutionalized patients and homeless people. In a UK census from 1993, 74% of people with schizophrenia living in institutions were found to be smokers. A 1999 study that covered all people with schizophrenia in Nithsdale, Scotland found a 58% prevalence of cigarette smoking, to compare with 28% in the general population. An older study found that as much as 88% of outpatients with schizophrenia were smokers.

Despite the higher prevalence of tobacco smoking, people diagnosed with schizophrenia have a much lower than average chance of developing and dying from lung cancer. While the reason for this phenomenon is unknown, there may be a genetic resistance to the cancers, a side effect of medications, and/or a statistical effect from increased likelihood of dying from causes other than lung cancer.

It is of interest that cigarette smoking affects liver function such that the antipsychotic drugs used to treat schizophrenia are metabolized more quickly. Consequently, smokers with schizophrenia need slightly higher doses of antipsychotic drugs in order to attain therapeutic effect.

The increased rate of smoking in schizophrenia may arise from a desire to self-medicate with nicotine. One possible reason is that smoking produces a short-term improvement in alertness and cognitive functioning. It has been postulated that the mechanism of this effect is that people with schizophrenia have a disturbance of nicotinic receptor functioning which is temporarily abated by tobacco use. However, some researchers have questioned whether self-medication is really the best explanation for the association.

A study from 1989 and a 2004 case study showed that when haloperidol is administered, nicotine limits the extent to which the antipsychotic increases the sensitivity of the dopamine-2 receptor. Dependent on the dopamine system, symptoms of Tardive Dyskinesia are not found in the nicotine-administered patients despite a roughly 70% increase in dopamine receptor activity, but the controls had more than 90% and developed symptoms. A 1997 study showed that antipsychotic-induced akathisia was significantly reduced upon administration of nicotine. This finding supports the notion that tobacco could be used to self-medicate by limiting effects of the illness, the medication, or both.

== Life experiences ==
=== Adversity ===
The chance of developing schizophrenia has been found to increase with the number of adverse social factors (e.g. indicators of socioeconomic disadvantage or social exclusion) present in childhood. Stressful life events generally precede the onset of schizophrenia. A personal or recent family history of migration is a considerable risk factor for schizophrenia, which has been linked to psychosocial adversity, social defeat from being an outsider, racial discrimination, family dysfunction, unemployment, and poor housing conditions. Unemployment and early separation from parents are some important factors associated with higher rates of schizophrenia among British African Caribbean populations, in comparison to native African Caribbean populations. This example shows that social disadvantage plays a role in the onset of schizophrenia, in addition to genetic vulnerability. Additionally, the onset of schizophrenia, according to the Dutch national register, used four of their largest immigrant groups, which included people from Turkey, Morocco, the Netherlands Antilles, and Surinam, to discover that rates of schizophrenia from those living in the Netherlands from these countries were higher than the native-born population.[203]

Childhood experiences of abuse or trauma are risk factors for a diagnosis of schizophrenia later in life. Large-scale general population studies indicate an increasing risk from additional experiences of maltreatment, although a critical review suggests conceptual and methodological issues require further research. There is some evidence that adversities may lead to cognitive biases and altered dopamine neurotransmission, a process that has been termed "sensitization". Childhood trauma, and bereavement or separation in families, have been found to be risk factors for schizophrenia and psychosis.

Specific social experiences have been linked to specific psychological mechanisms and psychotic experiences in schizophrenia. In addition, structural neuroimaging studies of survivors of sexual abuse and other trauma have sometimes reported findings similar to those found in some psychotic patients, such as thinning of the corpus callosum, loss of volume in the anterior cingulate cortex, and reduced hippocampal volume.

=== Urbanicity ===
A particularly stable and replicable finding has been the association between living in an urban environment and the development of schizophrenia, even after controlling for factors such as drug use, ethnic group and size of social group. A study of 4.4 million men and women in Sweden found a 68%–77% increased risk of diagnosed psychosis for people living in the most urbanized environments, a significant proportion of which is likely to be schizophrenia.

The effect does not appear to be due to a higher incidence of obstetric complications in urban environments. Risk increases with the number of years of urban living and degree of exposure to the urban environment in childhood and adolescence, regardless of whether or not a subject was born in such an environment. This suggests that constant, cumulative, and/or repeated exposures during upbringing that occur more frequently in urbanized areas are responsible for the association. The cumulative effects of pollution associated with the urban environment have been suggested as the link between urbanicity and the higher risk of developing schizophrenia.

Various possible explanations for the effect have been judged unlikely based on the nature of the findings, including infectious causes or a general stress effect. Urban living is thought to interact with genetic predisposition and, since there appears to be nonrandom variation even across different neighborhoods, and an independent association with social isolation, it has been proposed that the degree of "social capital" (e.g. degree of mutual trust, bonding and safety in neighborhoods) can exert a developmental impact on children growing up in urban environments.

Negative attitudes from others increase the risk of schizophrenia relapse, in particular hostility as well as authoritarian, intrusive and/or controlling attitudes (termed high expressed emotion by researchers). Although family members and significant others are not held responsible for schizophrenia — the attitudes, behaviors and interactions of all parties are addressed; unsupportive, dysfunctional relationships may also contribute to an increased risk of developing schizophrenia in predisposed individuals. The risk of developing schizophrenia can also be increased by an individual developing a very low sense of self, in which one's boundaries become confused with those of the mother and/or father. Firm psychological boundaries should be established between one's self and one's identity and those of the parents. Pushing the role of parents into the background and developing a healthy sense of self can be a method for recovery. Social support systems are very important for those with schizophrenia and the people with whom they have relationships.

== Synergistic effects ==
Experiments in mice have provided evidence that several stressors can act together to increase the risk of schizophrenia. In particular, the combination of a maternal infection during pregnancy followed by heightened stress at the onset of sexual maturity markedly increases the probability that a mouse develops neuropsychiatric symptoms, whereas the occurrence of one of these factors without the other does not.

== Other views ==
Schizophrenia is termed a mental illness because its causes are not completely known or understood. Psychiatrists R. D. Laing, Silvano Arieti, Theodore Lidz and others have argued that the symptoms of what is called mental illness are comprehensible reactions to impossible demands that society and particularly family life place on vulnerable individuals. Laing, Arieti and Lidz were notable in valuing the content of psychotic experiences as worthy of interpretation, rather than considering psychotic experiences simply secondary and possibly meaningless markers of underlying psychological or neurological distress. Laing described eleven case studies of people diagnosed with schizophrenia and argued that the content of their actions and statements was meaningful and logical in the context of their family and life contexts.

In 1956, Gregory Bateson and his colleagues Paul Watzlawick, Donald Jackson, and Jay Haley articulated a theory of schizophrenia, related to Laing's work, as stemming from double bind situations where a person receives different or contradictory messages. Madness was therefore an expression of this distress and should be valued as a cathartic and transformative experience. In the books Schizophrenia and the Family and The Origin and Treatment of Schizophrenic Disorders Lidz and his colleagues report their belief that parental behaviour can generally result in mental illness in children. Arieti's Interpretation of Schizophrenia won the 1975 scientific National Book Award in the United States.

The concept of schizophrenia as a result of civilization has been developed further by psychologist Julian Jaynes in his 1976 book The Origin of Consciousness in the Breakdown of the Bicameral Mind; he proposed that until the beginning of historic times, schizophrenia or a similar condition was the normal state of human consciousness. This would take the form of a "bicameral mind" where a normal state of low affect, suitable for routine activities, would be interrupted in moments of crisis by "mysterious voices" giving instructions, which early people characterized as interventions from the gods. Psychohistorians, on the other hand, accept the psychiatric diagnoses. However, unlike the current medical model of mental disorders, they may argue that poor parenting in tribal societies causes the shamans' schizoid personalities. Commentators such as Paul Kurtz and others have endorsed the idea that major religious figures experienced psychosis; they heard voices and displayed delusions of grandeur.

Modern clinical psychological research has indicated a number of processes which may precipitate episodes of schizophrenia. A number of cognitive biases and deficits have been identified. These include attribution biases in social interactions, difficulty distinguishing inner speech from that of external sources (source monitoring), difficulty with adjusting speech to the needs of the hearer, difficulties in the very earliest stages of processing visual information (including reduced latent inhibition), and an attentional bias toward threats.

Some of these tendencies have been shown to worsen or emerge under emotional stress or in confusing situations. As with related neurological findings, they are not common to all individuals with a diagnosis of schizophrenia, and it is not clear how specific they are to schizophrenia itself. However, the findings of cognitive deficits in schizophrenia are reliable and consistent enough for some researchers to argue that they may be partially diagnostic.

Impaired capacity to appreciate one's own and others' mental states has been reported to be the single-best predictor of poor social competence in schizophrenia, and similar cognitive features have been identified in close relatives of people diagnosed with schizophrenia, including those with schizotypal personality disorder.

A number of emotional factors have been implicated in schizophrenia, with some models putting them at the core of the disorder. It was thought that the appearance of blunted affect meant that they did not experience strong emotions, however, other studies have indicated that there is often a normal or even heightened level of emotionality, particularly in response to negative events or stressful social situations. Some theories suggest positive symptoms of schizophrenia can result from or be worsened by negative emotions, including depressed feelings, low self-esteem and feelings of vulnerability, inferiority or loneliness. Chronic negative feelings and maladaptive coping skills may explain some of the association between psychosocial stressors and symptomatology. Critical and controlling behaviour by significant others (high expressed emotion) causes increased emotional arousal and lowered self-esteem and a subsequent increase in positive symptoms such as unusual thoughts. Countries or cultures where schizotypal personalities or schizophrenia symptoms are more accepted or valued appear to be associated with reduced onset of, or increased recovery from, schizophrenia.

Related studies suggest that the content of delusional and psychotic beliefs in schizophrenia can be meaningful and play a causal or mediating role in reflecting the life history or social circumstances of the individual. Holding uncommon socio-cultural beliefs, for example due to ethnic background, has been linked to increased diagnosis of schizophrenia. The way an individual interprets his or her delusions and hallucinations (e.g. as threatening or as potentially positive) has also been found to influence functioning and recovery in patients.

Other lines of work that relate to the self in schizophrenia have linked the disorder to psychological dissociation or abnormal states of awareness and identity as understood from phenomenological perspective, such as in self-disorders.

Psychiatrist Tim Crow has argued that schizophrenia may be the evolutionary price we pay for a left brain hemisphere specialization for language. Since psychosis is associated with greater levels of right brain hemisphere activation and a reduction in the usual left brain hemisphere dominance, our language abilities may have evolved at the cost of causing schizophrenia when this system breaks down.

In alternative medicine, some practitioners believe that there is a vast number of physical causes for the diagnosis of schizophrenia. While some of these explanations may stretch credulity, others (such as heavy metal poisoning and nutritional imbalances) have been supported at least somewhat by research.

== Evolutionary psychology ==
Schizophrenia has been considered an evolutionary puzzle due to the combination of high aggregate heritability, relatively high prevalence (~1%), and reduced reproductive success. One explanation could be increased reproductive success by close relatives without symptoms, but this explanation seems unlikely. Nonetheless, it has been argued that a small endowment of schizotypy-increasing genes may increase reproductive success by increasing traits like creativity, verbal ability, and emotional sensitivity.
