= C16orf46 =

Human gene

C16orf46 protein

Identifiers
- Aliases
- External IDs: GeneCards: ; OMA:- orthologs
Orthologs
Species	Human	Mouse
Entrez	n/a	n/a
Ensembl	n/a	n/a
UniProt	n a	n/a
RefSeq (mRNA)	n/a	n/a
RefSeq (protein)	n/a	n/a
Location (UCSC)	n/a	n/a
PubMed search	n/a	n/a
- Wikidata
View/Edit Human

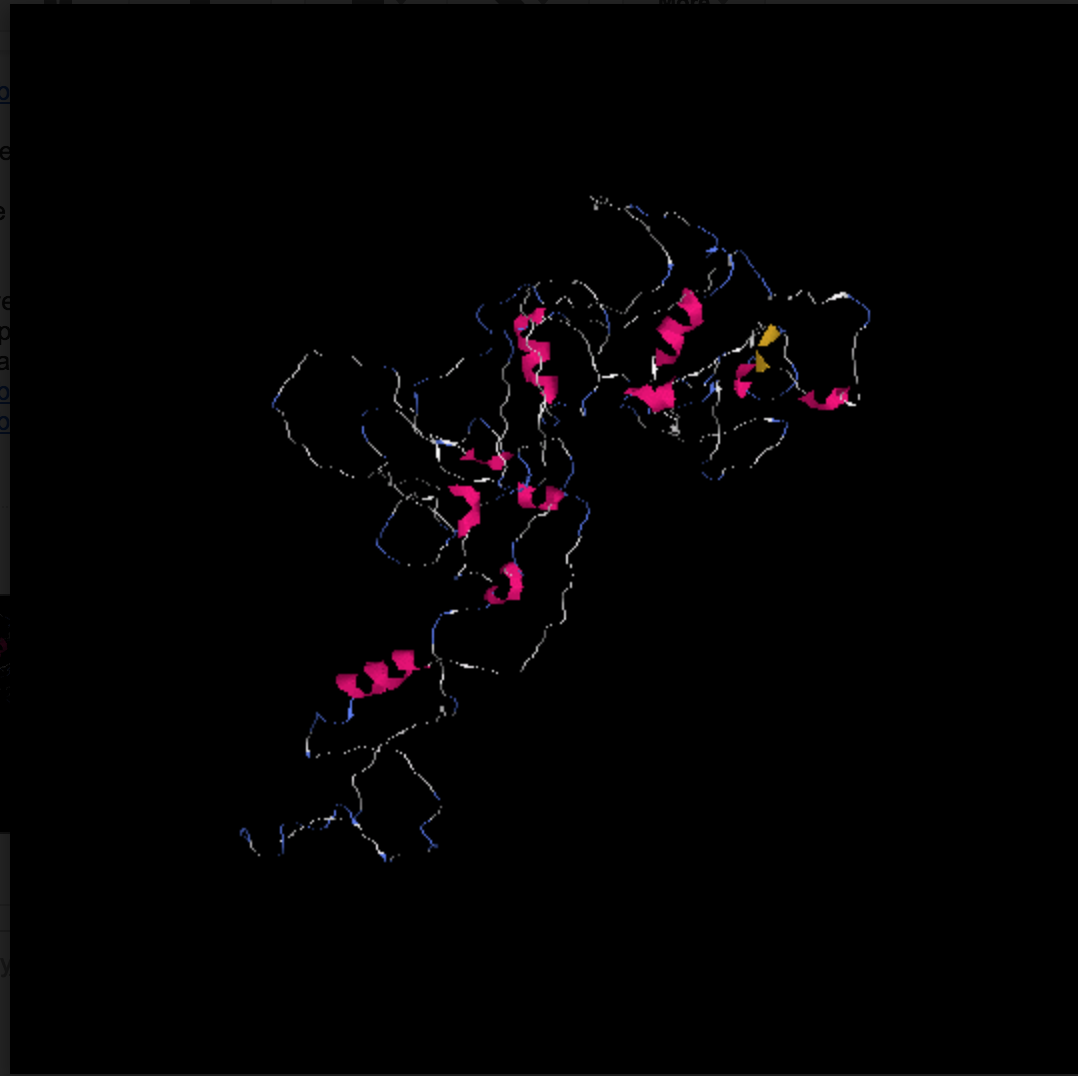
3D Rendering of C16orf46.

Chromosome 16 open reading frame 46 is a protein of yet to be determined function in Homo sapiens. It is encoded by the C16orf46 gene with NCBI accession number of NM_001100873. It is a protein-coding gene with an overlapping locus.

== Gene ==
An alternative name for this gene is FLJ32702, however it is most commonly referred to as C16orf46.

=== Location ===
The C16orf26 gene is found on chromosome 16q23.2 negative strand. The promoter region is 1152 base pairs long. It has three exons, one from 1-380 bp, the second from 381 to 1254 bp, and the third from 1255 to 1982 bp.

=== Expression ===
C16orf46 is broadly expressed in the testis and thyroid as well as 18 other tissues. These tissue expression patterns are found to be low to moderate (25-50%). When looking at tissue profiles, the highest expression is in the adult mammalian kidney, liver, prefrontal cortex, cerebellum, heart, and brain.

== Protein ==
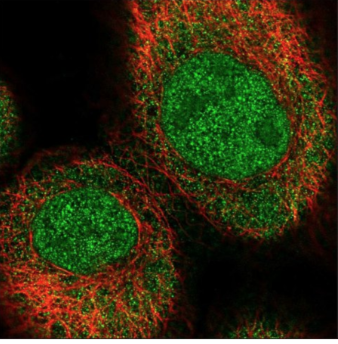
Immunofluorescence for C16orf46 in a rabbit.

=== Protein Analysis ===
The full C16orf46 protein is 417 amino acids long. It has no isoforms, and its most distant ortholog, Rhincodon typus (whale shark), also has no known isoforms. The molecular weight was found to be 45.8 kdal. The isoelectric point is 7.4, average for all proteins, and C16orf46 is electrically neutral.

C16orf46 is predicted to be found in the nucleus by all orthologs.

The secondary structure of C16orf46 has alternating alpha helices and beta sheets.

=== Protein Level Regulation ===
In C16orf46, there is N-linked glycosylation, O-linked glycosylation, and SUMOylation.

There are phosphorylation sites found with the kinases CKII, CKI, PKC, and cdc2.

A coronavirus cleavage site is predicted at the 235 amino acid position. There are also tyrosine motif locations between amino acids 42-45 and 251–252.

== Transcript Level Regulation ==
mRNA folding on the 5' UTR predicts a stem loop twice in the area between base pairs 47–90.

== Homologs ==
=== Orthologs ===
C16orf46 has over 50 orthologs ranging from primate to chordate. The table below shows a representation of the diversity of C16orf46 by listing a selection of orthologs found using NCBI. When C16orf46 Homo sapiens was run through a multiple alignment sequence program, Clustal Omega, against 20 true orthologs and 16 distant orthologs, Trp74 and Pro212 were found to be conserved in all.

Species	Common name	Divergence (MYA)	Accession number	Identity
Homo sapiens	Humans	---	XP_016878405.1	100.0%
Ochotona princeps	American Pika	90	XP_004584265.1	52.7%
Octodon degus	Common Degu	90	XP_003434773.2	47.8%
Ursus maritimus	Polar Bear	96	XP_008687958.1	67.5%
Leptonychotes weddellii	Weddell Seal	96	XP_006748170.1	67.2%
Canis lupus	Gray Wolf	96	XP_003434773.2	65.8%
Pteropus vampyrus	Large Flying Fox	96	XP_011354946.1	63.5%
Sus scrofa	Wild Boar	96	XP_020952705.1	61.5%
Bos indicus	Zebu	96	XP_019835282.1	60.2%
Erinaceus europaeus	European Hedgehog	96	XP_007516703.1	56.7%
Loxodonta africana	African Bush Elephant	105	XP_010596137.1	60.9%
Sarcophilus harrisii	Tasmanian Devil	159	XP_003757901.1	43.1%
Apteryx australis	Southern Brown Kiwi	312	XP_013796688.1	18.5%
Aptenodytes forsteri	Emperor Penguin	312	XP_019327074.1	17.4%
Chelonia mydas	Green Sea Turtle	312	XP_007059324.1	29.7%
Gekko japonicus	Gekko Japonicus	312	XP_015261305.1	25.3%
Nanorana parkeri	High Himalaya Frog	352	XP_018410908.1	22.4%
Pygocentrus nattereri	Red Bellied Piranha	435	XP_017578196.1	21.2%
Lepisosteus oculatus	Spotted Gar	435	XP_015223705.1	20.6%
Callorhinchus milii	Australian Ghost Shark	473	XP_007887408.1	22.7%

=== Paralogs ===
C16orf46 has no known paralogs.

== Mutations ==
C16orf46 has been compared against Fibrinogen, a protein which mutates rapidly, and Cytochrome C, a protein which mutates slowly.

As can be seen below, when multiple species of the three proteins were plotted, C16orf46 more closely resembled that of Fibrinogen than Cytochrome C, suggesting a possible rapid mutation.

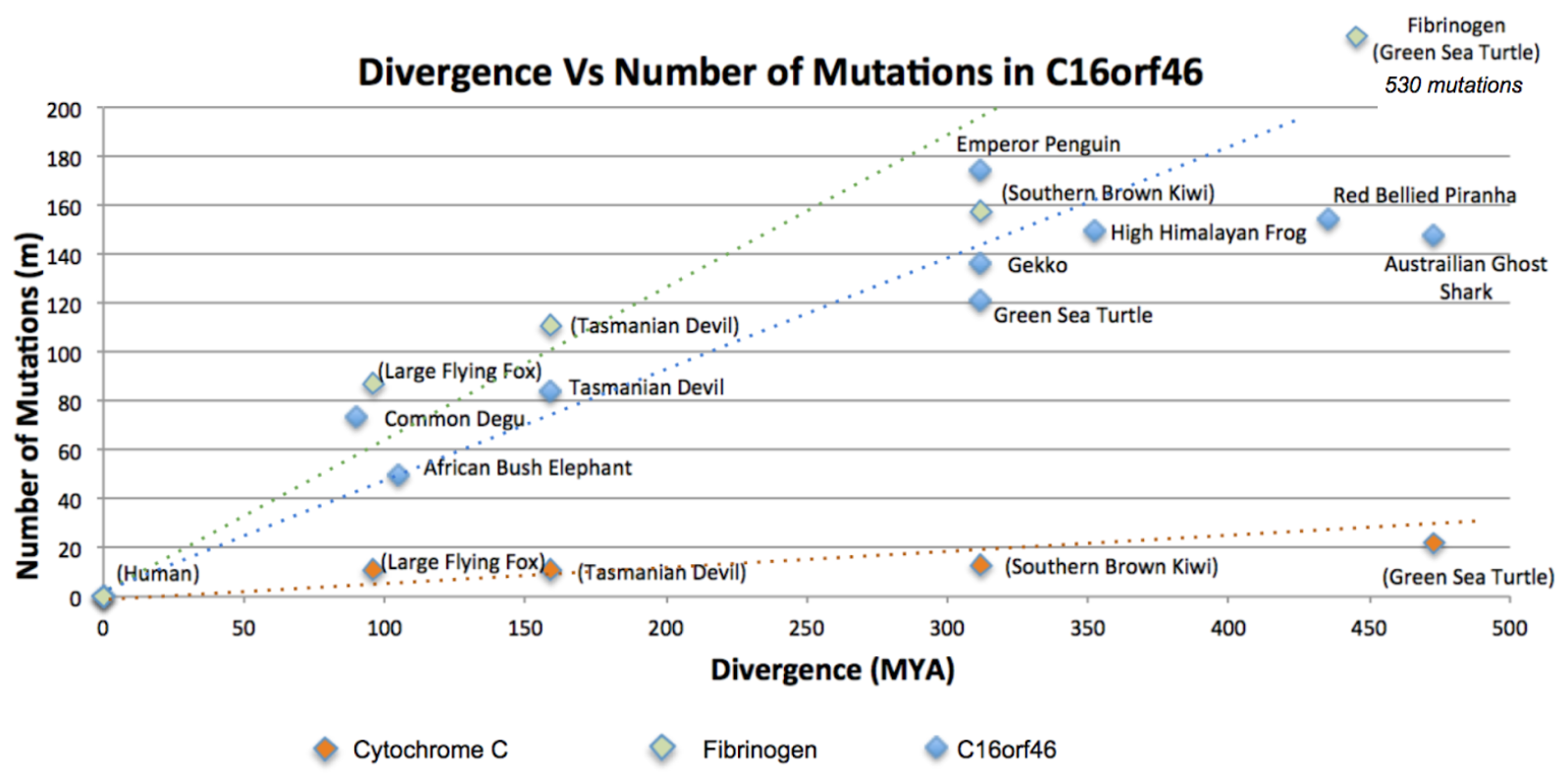
The trend of C16orf46, as compared to Fibrinogen and Cytochrome C, suggests faster mutation rates as it diverges from Homo sapiens.

== Interacting Proteins ==
C16orf46 interacts with FAT3 which has been linked to neurite interactions during development. C16orf46 is thought to have coexpression with the PLAC8L1 and CFAP43 gene, both of unknown function.

== Clinical Significance ==
There are higher levels of C16orf46 expression in pancreatic adenocarcinoma tumor epithelia tissue compared to the control. There is also higher gene expression in patients with small-cell carcinoma compared to the control.
