= Ari Rappoport =

Ari Rappoport (1962 – June 23, 2025) was a professor of computer science at the Hebrew University of Jerusalem. In the last 15 years of his life, he expanded his research to neuroscience, neurology, and psychiatry, where he developed theories about brain activity, disorders, and diseases.

== Early life and education ==
He was born and raised in Jerusalem, the son of Zvi Rappoport, a chemistry professor. He studied in elementary and high school at the Hebrew Gymnasium Rehavia and graduated in 1980. He did his military service in Unit 8200.

From 1985 to 1987 he completed a bachelor's degree in mathematics and computer science at the Hebrew University of Jerusalem. His doctoral dissertation, supervised by Lawrence Rudolph, entitled "Data Structures and Algorithms for Computational Graphics and Geometric Sampling", was done at the Hebrew University of Jerusalem in 1987–1990.

== Career ==
In 1991, he joined the faculty of the Hebrew University of Jerusalem's School of Computer Science, and eventually became a full professor.

In 2010, together with doctoral students Oren Tzur and Dmitry Davidov, he developed an algorithm for identifying sarcasm, which was one of the 50 greatest inventions of 2010 according to Time magazine.

=== Theory about brain disorders ===
In 2025, his book The Science of the Brain: Function, Dysfunction and Disease was published by Elsevier. In the book, Rappoport offered explanations for a number of psychiatric and neurological conditions. In the course of writing the book, Rappoport read nearly 500,000 articles and carefully read 40,000 of them.

His work was recognized by Nobel Laureate Roger Kornberg, who described Rappoport's work as bringing "exceptional insight and analytical ability to the entirety of brain science, and derived unprecedented understanding and predictive power, as well as detailed treatment proposals."

== Personal life ==
Rappoport was married twice, and was the father of five children. He died on June 23, 2025, after a battle with small cell lung cancer despite being a non-smoker.

== See also ==
- Causes of schizophrenia
