= Effects of estrogen on schizophrenia =

An increase in symptoms of schizophrenia has been observed to correspond with decreasing levels of estrogen in menopausal women. This observation has led researchers to propose a link between estrogen and schizophrenia. While the first onset of schizophrenia generally occurs between the ages of 20 and 25 for men, first onset occurs approximately 5 years later for women, with a second peak (late onset schizophrenia) between the ages of 40 and 45. Animal studies suggest that estrogen acts as a barrier to dopamine receptors, and so may prevent the increase in dopamine found in patients with schizophrenia. However, in contradictory studies, estrogen either increased or decreased dopamine receptors, depending on the duration of the experiment.

When estrogen levels are low, women are more susceptible and respond poorly to anti-psychotic drugs. Consequently, estrogen is often used to treat schizophrenia in women. Studies show that estrogen patches can reduce the positive symptoms of schizophrenia (at least in the short term). Researchers believe that estrogen could also be used to treat this disease in men.

== Age of onset ==
Gender differences have been observed in the age of onset of schizophrenia. Women have a later age of onset and on average they are diagnosed 2 to 10 years later than men. In fact, the first onset of schizophrenia for men occurs around the ages of 20 to 25, while in women the first onset generally occurs between the ages of 25 and 30 years. However, it has also been noted that in women a second peak in schizophrenia occurs at the ages of 40 to 45. During this period there is a significant drop in estrogen levels in the body. These factors have led researchers to believe that estrogen may have an effect on psychosis in women.

In support of the above-mentioned conclusions many studies have been performed. Doctors Lindamer, Lohr, Harris, and Jeste conducted a study to determine age of onset of schizophrenia in which they examined gender differences in 194 patients ranging in age from 35 to 97. They found that the mean age for onset in men was 30, while in women it was 39. This is one study, and overall averages come from a combination of different studies). About 37% of the women developed schizophrenia at the age of 45, while only 16% of men reported the same. Thus, more women than men experience late onset schizophrenia. This indicates that there is indeed another peak for women at the age of 45 and women do develop schizophrenia later in life.

Another study was conducted on older men and women to determine how schizophrenia affects them. The study consisted of 36 women and 86 men, all of similar age. More women than men were found to have paranoid schizophrenia and had more from severe positive symptoms rather than negative symptoms. All of this information is consistent with other studies showing that women have a later age of onset of schizophrenia and have more severe positive symptoms rather than negative symptoms.

== Estrogen and dopamine ==
Genetic factors have much to do with developing schizophrenia. In fact the "heritability of schizophrenia is around 80%, and a first degree relative has a 5 to 10 fold increase in the risk of developing the disorder compared to the risk for the general population." It seems that individuals with schizophrenia inherit problems associated with dopamine in the brain. According to Answers.com, dopamine is a "neurotransmitter... essential to the normal functioning of the central nervous system." In the 1950s Arvid Carlsson "designated the molecule dopamine ... as a neurotransmitter". This led to the dopamine hypothesis of schizophrenia.

Animal studies provide evidence that estrogen regulates dopamine systems. In the studies performed on animals estrogen seems to act as a barrier to dopamine receptors. Thus estrogen may prevent the increase in dopamine found in patients with schizophrenia. This directly supports the idea that estrogen acts as a deterrent. This would explain why women have a peak in the onset of schizophrenia in their late forties since at this time estrogen levels drop in women, causing the dopamine to increase, resulting in psychotic symptoms.

Biochemical studies prove contradictory to this approach. In these studies the estrogen either increased or decreased dopamine receptors, depending on the time allotted for the experiment. This contradicts the theory that estrogen inhibits dopamine receptors, therefore acting as a protectorate against schizophrenia.

== Estrogen as a treatment ==
Estrogen is often used to treat schizophrenia in women. According to an online science article, "Prof. Ina Weiner of Tel Aviv University's Department of Psychology and her doctoral student Michal Arad have reported findings suggesting that restoring normal levels of estrogen may work as a protective agent in menopausal women." This supports the theory that estrogen acts as a protectorate against schizophrenia. According to Dr. Weiner it has been known for a long time that when estrogen levels are low women are more susceptible and respond poorly to anti-psychotic drugs, thus supporting the use of estrogen as a treatment. In the study Dr. Weiner and Arad performed, ovaries were removed from rats resulting in low estrogen much like in menopause. As a result of the ovaries removal the rats showed schizophrenia like symptoms. To test if estrogen replacements work in reducing schizophrenia symptoms the rats were then given estrogen, and as predicted the schizophrenia symptoms decreased. The anti-psychotic drug haloperidol was also given to rats, but showed no signs of relieving the schizophrenia-like behavior, providing evidence for the effectiveness of estrogen in comparison with other anti-psychotic drugs. They also found that estrogen is effective for relieving schizophrenia in both male and female rats. In addition they found that low amounts of estrogen increase the effectiveness of anti-psychotic drugs. Although this study suggests that estrogen helps in alleviating symptoms, many argue that it could have side effects such as cervical cancer and heart attacks.

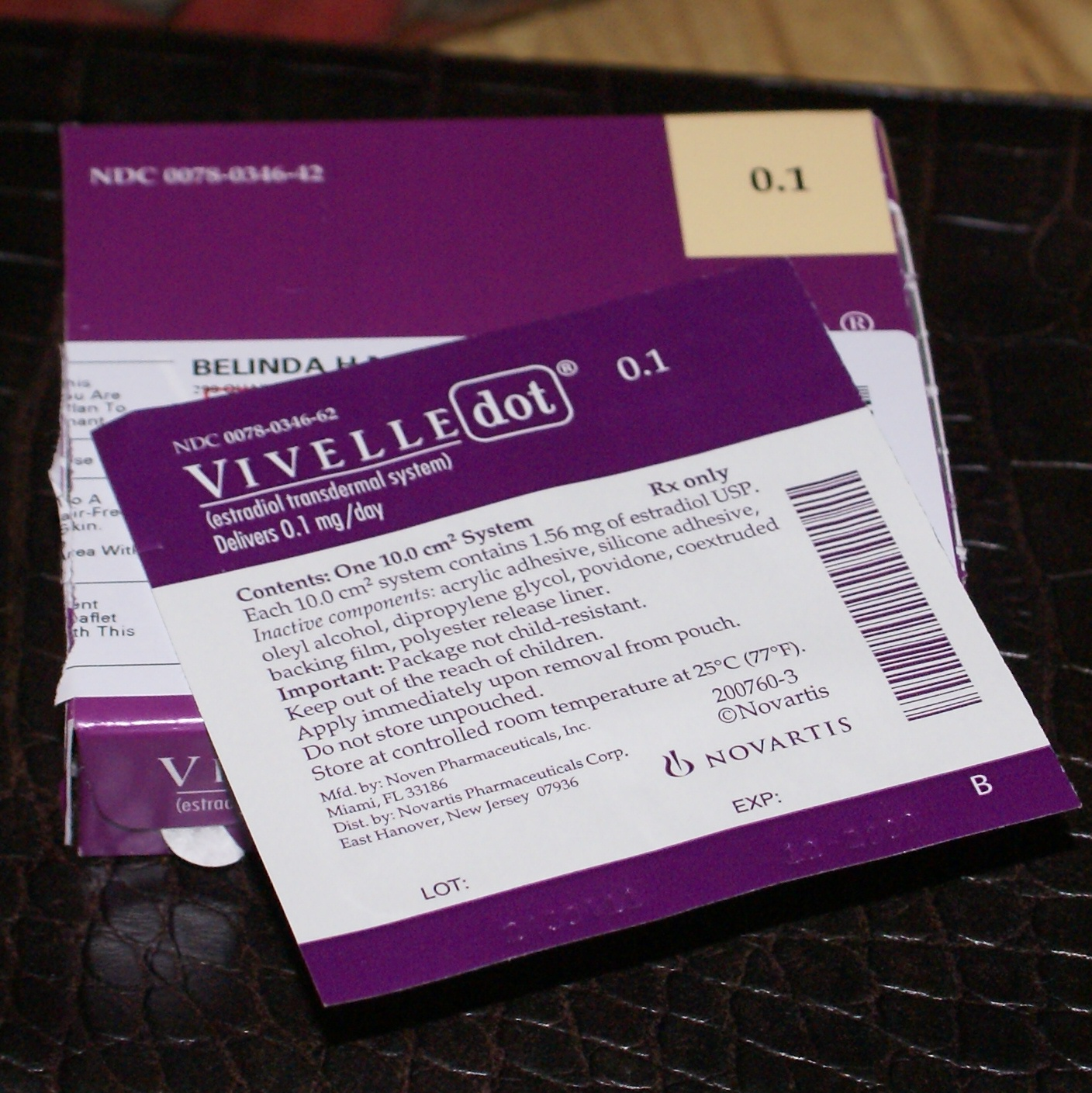
Vivelle-dot, an estrogen patch

As a result of her study, Dr. Weiner concluded that women with schizophrenia should be given estrogen supplements in their mid-twenties and in their forties, when estrogen levels are decreased. This would improve the effectiveness of anti-psychotic drugs and would help in assisting women with schizophrenia in maintaining a normal lifestyle without peaks of schizophrenia in their forties. Dr. Weiner also believes that since men are less likely to develop schizophrenia after the age of forty, it is likely that estrogen is the "culprit".

In 2008 a study was done to test the effectiveness of estrogen patches on schizophrenia patients. Over a period of four weeks the individuals tested showed a reduction in positive symptoms; however they showed no differences in negative symptoms. It is still not known exactly how estrogen helps in alleviating schizophrenia, however from this study the researchers felt that perhaps estrogen causes "rapid actions on cerebral blood flow and/or glucose metabolism". They also recognized that receptors for estrogen are located throughout the brain, thus the hormone estrogen can regulate neurotransmitters. They also noted that although in the short term estrogen can have positive effects, they are unsure of its reliability in the long term. However, they stated that they believed that estrogen could also be used in men, as previously found in other studies.

Another study done in 1995 also showed that estrogen relieves positive symptoms in patients. In this study .02 mg of estrogen was administered to premenopausal women with schizophrenia. They found that at first the estrogen increased the efficiency of neuroleptics, but over a long period of time the effect of the estrogen reversed and decreased the efficiency of the drugs. The researchers concluded that while estrogen helps in the short term, in the long term it can be detrimental. These results were also found in the study mentioned previously.
