= ARVCF =

Protein-coding gene in the species Homo sapiens

Identifiers
- Aliases: ARVCF, armadillo repeat gene deleted in velocardiofacial syndrome, delta catenin family member, ARVCF delta catenin family member
- External IDs: OMIM: 602269; MGI: 109620; GeneCards: ARVCF

Gene location (Human)
Chr.	Chromosome 22 (human)
Band	22q11.21	Start	19,969,896 bp
Band	22q11.21	End	20,016,823 bp

Gene location (Mouse)
Chr.	Chromosome 16 (mouse)
Band	16 A3|16 11.37 cM	Start	18,348,182 bp
Band	16 A3|16 11.37 cM	End	18,407,076 bp
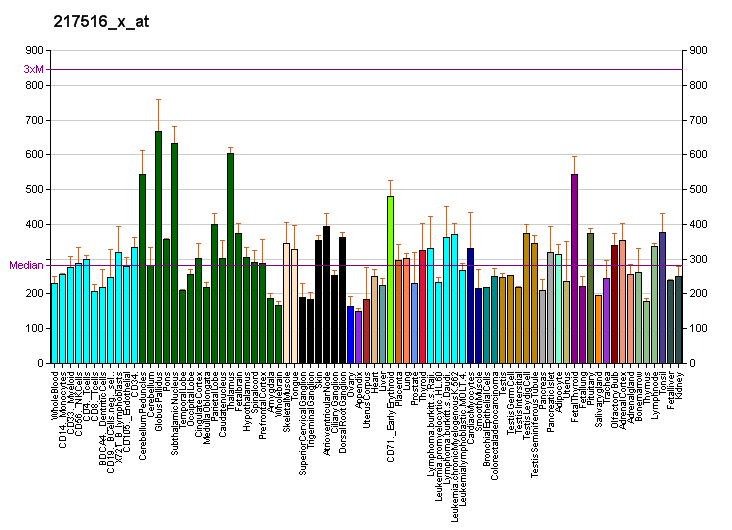

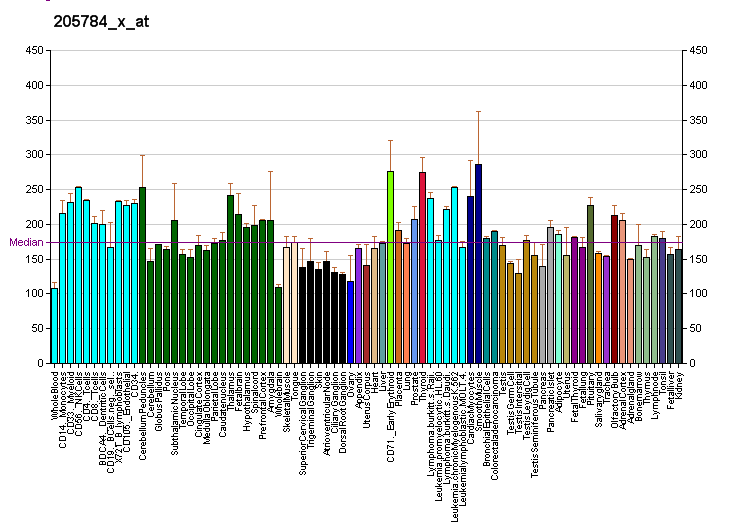
RNA expression pattern
Bgee	Human / Mouse (ortholog); Top expressed in: cerebellar hemisphere; right hemisphere of cerebellum; beta cell; olfactory bulb; right lobe of thyroid gland; ventricular zone; ascending aorta; vena cava; apex of heart; sural nerve / Top expressed in: lens; ventricular zone; mesencephalon; ganglionic eminence; neural tube; uterus; hypothalamus; placenta; lip; rhombencephalon; More reference expression data
BioGPS	More reference expression data
Gene ontology
Molecular function	protein binding; cadherin binding
Cellular component	cytoplasm; plasma membrane; intracellular anatomical structure; nucleus; cell-cell junction
Biological process	multicellular organism development; calcium-dependent cell-cell adhesion via plasma membrane cell adhesion molecules; cell adhesion; cell-cell adhesion; cell-cell junction assembly
Sources:Amigo / QuickGO
Orthologs
Databases	NCBI: entry; OMA: entry
Species	Human	Mouse
Entrez	421	11877
Ensembl	ENSG00000099889	ENSMUSG00000000325
UniProt	O00192	P98203
RefSeq (mRNA)	NM_001670	NM_001272028; NM_001272029; NM_001272030; NM_001272031; NM_001272032 NM_033474
RefSeq (protein)	NP_001661	NP_001258957; NP_001258958; NP_001258959; NP_001258960; NP_001258961 NP_258435
Location (UCSC)	Chr 22: 19.97 – 20.02 Mb	Chr 16: 18.35 – 18.41 Mb
PubMed search
- Wikidata
View/Edit Human	View/Edit Mouse

Armadillo repeat protein deleted in velo-cardio-facial syndrome is a protein that in humans is encoded by the ARVCF gene.

== Function ==
Armadillo repeat gene deleted in Velo-Cardio-Facial syndrome (ARVCF) is a member of the catenin family which play an important role in the formation of adherens junction complexes, which are thought to facilitate communication between the inside and outside environments of a cell. ARVCF gene was isolated in the search for the genetic defect responsible for the autosomal dominant Velo-Cardio-Facial syndrome (VCFS) a relatively common human disorder with phenotypic features including cleft palate, conotruncal heart defects and facial dysmorphology. ARVCF gene encodes a protein containing two motifs, a coiled coil domain in the N-terminus and a 10 armadillo repeat sequence in the midregion. Since these sequences can facilitate protein-protein interactions ARVCF is thought to function in a protein complex. In addition, ARVCF contains a predicted nuclear-targeting sequence suggesting that it may have a function as a nuclear protein.

== Interactions ==
ARVCF has been shown to interact with CDH15.
