= Prenatal stress =

Prenatal stress, also known as prenatal maternal stress, occurs when an expectant mother is exposed to psychosocial or physical stress. This can be brought on by daily events or environmental hardships.^{[1] [2]} According to the Developmental Origins of Health and Disease (DOHaD), a wide range of environmental factors a woman may experience during the perinatal period can contribute to biological impacts and changes in the fetus that then cause health risks later in the child's life. Health risks include impaired cognitive development, low birth weight, mental disorders, and gender specific deficits in the offspring.

== Research ==
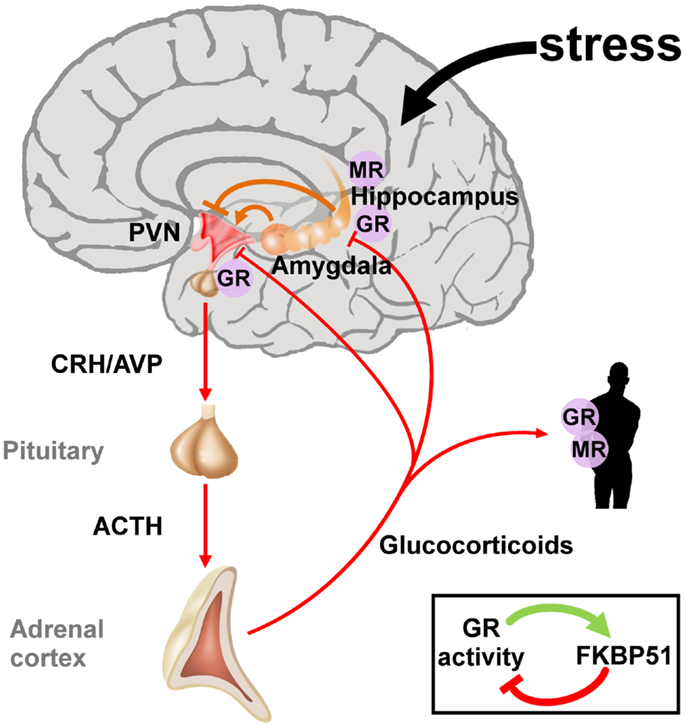
The hypothalamic-pituitary-adrenal axis responds to stress with the release of glucocorticoids from the adrenal gland.

Studies explore the way that prenatal stress impacts the fetus's development. One of the ways the body responds to stress is via the hypothalamic-pituitary-adrenal (HPA) axis. Expectant mothers that experience high levels of stressors trigger a response from the HPA axis. This then triggers the release of glucocorticoids. This increases the level of glucocorticoid in the mother and the fetus. Studies show that elevated levels of glucocorticoids can affect neurodevelopment in the fetus.

Some research includes studies like McKenna et al. suggesting that the idea of pregnancy can cause an increased risk of psychopathology and these exposures during gestation impacts epigenetic. The mother's usage of selective serotonin repute inhibitors (SSRIs) was observed while the epigenetic age of the child was calculated through fetal umbilical cord blood.

Saboory et al. found that prenatal psychosocial stress can cause delays in child growth and development through assessing the child's weight, height and head circumference every two months after they were born. They also assessed the child's cognitive development through the use of the Ages and Stages Questionnaire (ASQ).

Another study, Brannigan et al. focused on how prenatal stress contributes to personality disorders by looking at children decades later born from mothers who spent time in a mental health clinic in Finland.

All of this research had found negative correlations between prenatal stress and the child's development.

== Timing of prenatal stress ==
A study by Sandman and Davis shows that the timing of prenatal stress is crucial to understanding how prenatal stress affects prenatal and postnatal development. Cortisol is often used to measure stress as it is a hormone that is released during stressful events. If an expectant mother is experiencing a stressful event such as income insecurity or being a teenage mother, cortisol is secreted as a result. However, as demonstrated by Sandman and Davis, the timing of cortisol release can sometimes have a harmful effect on development and sometimes not depending on when in pregnancy stress is experienced. Prenatal stress can increase the likelihood of maternal and endocrinological problems. Prenatal stress can even cause the embryo to arrive earlier than expected.

Sandman and Davis studied "125 full- term infants at 3, 6, and 12 months of age" to determine the effects of maternal cortisol timing differences on development. They found that "exposure to elevated concentrations of cortisol early in gestation was associated with a slower rate of development over the 1st year and lower mental development scores at 12 months" and "elevated levels of maternal cortisol late in gestation were associated with accelerated cognitive development and higher scores at 12 months". Overall, cortisol's effects on infant cognitive development are dependent upon the timing of cortisol release. Furthermore, prenatal stress can have an effect on fetal development by causing obesity, diabetes, cardiovascular disease, and other problems.

== Impact on development ==
Poor eating habits and lack of physical activity are not the only contributing factors to prenatal stress on the baby. Stress on the mother during pregnancy can lead to issues in cognitive development, social development and more. A great deal of brain development happens during the fetal period in pregnancy and the progress happens rapidly in this stage. Since there is such a large amount of growth occurring during this time-period in the child's life, there are a lot of outside factors in the environment that can affect this development. These outside factors could be anything from poor nutrition, excess cortisol levels or even genetic influences. The fetus's development can be impacted through the level of the placenta, and there is evidence to show how prenatal stress can have consequences on the placenta and in turn the fetus during pregnancy.

The resulting effects can impact many different areas of the developing child's brain, such as the hypothalamus, corpus callosum, amygdala, hippocampus, and cerebellum. Animal studies have shown that prenatal stress may result in reduced hippocampus volumes and amygdala nuclei volumes, both of which may have a negative impact on memory. There is indirect evidence to suggest that prenatal stress could alter the size and morphology of the corpus callosum, and it is known that alterations in the corpus callosum are observed in autism, ADHD, and schizophrenia. Furthermore, alterations to the cerebellum may also be involved in autism, ADHD, and schizophrenia, and prenatal stress may also play a role in altering the physiology of the cerebellum. Studies done in rats have shown that prenatal stress may affect the size and number of granule cells in the cerebellum, as well as cause an increase in the number of Purkinje cells. Also shown in rats, there is evidence to suggest that prenatal stress can result in the feminization of males by reducing the volume one of the hypothalamic nuclei that is involved in the sexual behavior of males.

These impacts have mostly been noted in animal studies because of the concerns that surround human studies with prenatal stress. The ethical concerns with human studies and prenatal stress have led to little to no studies showing the direct impacts stress can have on fetal development, and it has shown to be difficult to draw inferences and connections between the animal studies and human pregnancies. It has been suggested that one way to monitor the impact of stress on the infant's development is through the mother's exposure to natural disasters. There has been some research analyzing how natural disasters such as hurricanes can affect fetal development when the mother is exposed during pregnancy. This research showed that there were impacts psychologically on the children who were exposed to this type of stress in the womb, in terms of increased risk for developing childhood psychopathologies. Natural disaster research like this has shown the effects of stress on pregnancy without the issues that surround human research and is able to show results within humans instead of drawing from other animals.

Prenatal distress has been shown to increase the risk that the offspring will develop a mental disorder as well as the severity of some symptoms. Typical disorders that are increased due to prenatal distress include autism, the severity of ADHD, and the development of mood disorders. Prenatal stress disrupts multiple developmental systems within the individual carrying offspring. One of the disrupted processes is hormone production. Maternal exposure to excess dihydrotestosterone, progestin, and norethindrone have been linked to a higher risk of offspring developing ASD. A 2008 study found that children whose mothers experienced moderate to severe stress during their pregnancy tended to develop symptoms that more frequently fell on the severe side of the ADHD severity spectrum. This distinction was made in comparison to those with ADHD whose mothers were not exposed to prenatal stressors. This increased development of ADHD from heightened prenatal distress can be due to many factors, one of the more popular and founded claims being the neurological development of the offspring. Exposure to stress during the process of pregnancy affects fetal brain development and predisposes offspring to the development of a multitude of mental disorders. Many studies have found that there is an association between ADHD and lessened functioning within the prefrontal cortex (PFC). This area of the brain plays a crucial role in attention regulation as well as behavioral and emotional control. The PFC right hemisphere in particular has been linked to decreased size in individuals who have ADHD. This is notable due to the important role of the PFC right hemisphere which is behavioral inhibition, a common struggle for individuals with ADHD. Prenatal distress has also been linked to the development of mood disorders such as depression or anxiety. A 2019 study found that prenatal distress, specifically during the first 20 weeks of gestation, was linked to higher mood dysregulation and lower grey matter (GM) volume. The lessening of grey matter volume is a detrimental loss because of the multitude of functions that this structure is essential for. Grey matter is found throughout the central nervous system and is crucial for motor function, memory, and emotions. The reduction of GM volume is impactful in many negative ways which is another contributing factor that can lead to the development of mental disorders in children that experience in utero stress.

== Genetic changes ==
Stress during the development of the fetus can be inherited and change the gene expression in the fetus. This change is an epigenetic change that modifies but does not affect the building of the DNA sequence. This modification will affect whether the gene is turned off or on and will lead to Transgenerational Stress Inheritance.

One of the pathways that has been studied is the inheritance of disrupted heterochromatin. Heterochromatin is important in many functions of the cell mostly in gene regulation. During high levels of stress during pregnancy dATF-2, which is required for formation of heterochromatin, will phosphorylate and disrupt the formation. This will lead to the release of dATF-2 from the heterochromatin, which then can be inherited in offspring.

Another pathway that prenatal stress can interfere with fetal development is telomere length. A telomere is a structure of repetitive DNA sequences that can be found at the end of chromosomes. They are made up of the same short DNA sequence that is repeated multiple times and serve to protect the ends of chromosomes so they do not become damaged. Another function of telomeres is to allow chromosomes to properly function in the process of replication. However, each time a cell divides, the telomeres loses length and becomes shorter. After repeated replications they will eventually become so short that the cell is unable to divide any further and the cell will die. When offspring are exposed to prenatal distress during development it can affect the length of the offspring's telomeres, more specifically it can result in shortened telomeres. Shortened telomeres have been linked to multiple issues including shortened lifespan and increased risk of diseases. Typically, telomeres shorten substantially with increasing age, and telomere length is thus a bioindicator of aging. However, prenatal stress puts offspring at an increased state of vulnerability by shortening the telomeres and leaving less room for shortening as the offspring continue to age.

== Sexually dimorphic brain regions ==
Prenatal stress inhibits the masculinization of the male brain by inhibiting the growth of the sexually cluster of cells of the preoptic area. Prenatal stress does have an effect on brain sexual differentiation after measuring the volume of the sexually dimorphic nucleus of the preoptic area of both female and males in the control and stressed groups.

Previous studies found that a decrease in testosterone is seen in pups of prenatally stressed mothers. Authors suggest this may cause the reduced in the sexually dimorphic nucleus of the preoptic area and says it is similar to the effects of neonatal castration. Also, stressed males had larger sexually dimorphic nucleus of the preoptic area at birth, but then at 20 and 60 days are found to only have 50% of the volume of the control males. Whereas control males are two times larger than control females on days 20 and 60, but the stressed males show no statistical difference to control females on respective days. These findings show support that the male brain is not showing the expected sexual dimorphism when prenatally stressed.

Another study led by Kerchner et al. investigated the volume of the medial amygdala and the two compartments posterodorsal and the posteroventral in mice that also were prenatally stressed. Posterodorsal is thought to show organizational and activational effects from gonadal steroids. The medial amygdala for the control and stressed males was 85% larger than females with the males (stressed and control) resembling each other.

To look for specific regions within the medial amygdala that may have been affected, data showed that both the posterodorsal and posteroventral, all male groups were larger in volume than the females, but male groups did not significantly differ from each other. This study confirmed that the medial amygdala is sexually dimorphic; the males are larger than the females.

The posterodorsal and posteroventral were shown to be sexually dimorphic too. The writer suggested that these areas may act similarly to sexually dimorphic nucleus of the preoptic area in response to testosterone, but prenatal stress did not show an effect on the medial amygdala as it does on the sexually dimorphic nucleus of the preoptic area. Also, the posteroventral was 40% larger in control males than females. These results were thought to be caused by the sensitive period of the medial amygdala which is in the first days after birth. The medial amygdala, posterodorsal and posteroventral all show to be resistant against demasculinization from prenatal stress. A longitudinal study done on prenatal stress and gender roles showed that prenatal stress only plays a small part in the gender roles the offspring takes on and mentions it has more to do with older siblings, maternal use of alcohol and/or tobacco, maternal education, and the observance or teaching of "traditional sex roles" from the parents.

== Prenatal stress and gender differences in hormones ==
In humans, prenatal stress affects development differently in boys and girls. Males may exhibit less masculine characteristics as a result of prenatal stress, whereas females may exhibit less feminine characteristics. Prenatal stress, on the other hand, can have serious consequences for both genders.

Particularly in the striatum of the prenatally stressed male pups showed an increase in vanilmandelic acid, dopamine, serotonin, 5-hydroxyindoleacetic acid which all can affect sexual behavior. The prenatally stressed male pups showed a significant latency in mounting behavior when compared to controls.

When performing the radial arm maze task, prenatally stressed male rats showed a greater increase in dopamine than prenatally stressed females, which is thought to facilitate impairment in the males but improve female performance. Females who were prenatally stressed also had an effect on corticosterone secretion.

Being prenatally stressed increased the anxiety response of the female rats. Yet, it had no effect on the males.

== COVID-19 Impact on Pregnant Women ==
Prenatal stress has increased as a result of the recent changes caused by the COVID-19 pandemic. Researchers are attempting to determine how the pandemic relates to prenatal stress, why so many women are experiencing stress and anxiety, and how these issues can be avoided. Researchers conducted a study by developing a questionnaire for pregnant women that included age, sex, race, health insurance status, financial status, any pregnancy risks, medical conditions, treatments, doctor's appointments, how many appointments were canceled due to COVID-19, and stress levels on a scale of mild, moderate, and severe. Three-quarters of the research participants were white or non-Hispanic, according to the questionnaire. There were 280 women who reported mild cases, 170 who reported moderate cases, and 171 who reported severe cases. Following the questionnaire, researchers discovered that mothers were experiencing high levels of anxiety and stress because they were afraid of contacting the covid virus and having the virus affect their fetus, having one person in the delivery room, and making online appointments without being checked in person. As a result, researchers proposed that there should be in-person engagement for the mother, information provided to the mother about COVID-19 and the protocols to reduce the risk of contacting it, and consistent check-in appointments to check the mother's mental health status.

== Prenatal stress and mindfulness-based interventions ==
Prenatal stress and negative mood during pregnancy has been shown to increase the risk for poor childbirth outcomes and postnatal maternal mood problems. Prenatal distress can interfere with the mother-infant attachment and child development outcomes. Despite the clear association between prenatal stress and child outcomes, women do not receive screening, prevention, or treatment for mood or stress concerns.

It is essential to examine interventions that aim to reduce anxiety, depression, and stress during pregnancy. Mindfulness-based stress reduction has been demonstrated to reduce anxiety and depression for people with stress-related and chronic medical conditions.

One pilot study shows promise for the potential of a mindfulness-based intervention to reduce negative affect and anxiety of women during pregnancy. Based out of the California Pacific Medical Center Research Institute, investigators Dr. Cassandra Vieten and Dr. John Astin conducted a wait-list control pilot study that tested a group-based mindfulness intervention. There were 31 women enrolled in the study: 13 women were assigned to the intervention and 18 women were assigned to the control group.

Measures of anxiety, negative affect, positive affect, depression, mindfulness, perceived stress, and affect regulation were taken before intervention or control was assigned and after the intervention or control was completed. Measures were repeated at a follow-up visit 3 months after the intervention or control was completed. The investigators found a significant decrease in anxiety (p<.05) and negative affect (p <.04) in women who completed the mindfulness based intervention, but not a significant decrease in depression, positive affect, mindfulness, affect regulation, and perceived stress.

These results suggest that mindfulness intervention during pregnancy reduce anxiety and negative affect of mothers. This study is a promising start to the potential impact that mindfulness based interventions could have on reducing prenatal stress, and thereby improving child outcomes.
