= Glutamate hypothesis of schizophrenia =

Hypothesis that decreased glutamatergic signalling is involved in schizophrenia

The glutamate hypothesis of schizophrenia models the subset of pathologic mechanisms of schizophrenia linked to glutamatergic signaling. The hypothesis was initially based on a set of clinical, neuropathological, and, later, genetic findings pointing at a hypofunction of glutamatergic signaling via NMDA receptors. While thought to be more proximal to the root causes of schizophrenia, it does not negate the dopamine hypothesis, and the two may be ultimately brought together by circuit-based models. The development of the hypothesis allowed for the integration of the GABAergic and oscillatory abnormalities into the converging disease model and made it possible to discover the causes of some disruptions.

Like the dopamine hypothesis, the development of the glutamate hypothesis developed from the observed effects of mind-altering drugs. However, where dopamine agonists can mimic positive symptoms with significant risks to brain structures during and after use, NMDA antagonists mimic some positive and negative symptoms with less brain harm, when combined with a GABA_{A} activating drug. Likely, both dopaminergic and glutaminergic abnormalities are implicated in schizophrenia, from a profound alteration in the function of the chemical synapses, as well as electrical synaptic irregularities. These form a portion of the complex constellation of factors, neurochemically, psychologically, psychosocially, and structurally, which result in schizophrenia.

== Role of heteromer formation ==
Alteration in the expression, distribution, autoregulation, and prevalence of specific glutamate heterodimers alters relative levels of paired G proteins to the heterodimer-forming glutamate receptor in question.

Namely: 5-HT_{2A} and mGluR2 receptors form a dimer which mediates psychotomimetic and entheogenic effects of psychedelics; as such, this is of interest in schizophrenia. Agonists at either constituent receptor may modulate the other receptor allosterically; e.g. glutamate-dependent signaling via mGluR2 may modulate 5HT_{2A}-ergic activity. Equilibrium between mGluR2/5HT2A is altered against tendency towards of psychosis by neuroleptic-pattern 5HT_{2A} antagonists and mGluR2 agonists; both display antipsychotic activity. AMPA receptor, the most widely distributed receptor in the brain, is a tetrameric ionotropic receptor; alterations in equilibrium between constituent subunits are seen in mGluR2/5HT_{2A} antagonist (antipsychotic) administration - mGluR2 is seen to be upregulated in the PFC while mGluR1 downregulates in response to antipsychotic administration.

Reelin abnormalities may also be involved in the pathogenesis of schizophrenia via a glutamate-dependent mechanism. Reelin expression deficits are seen in schizophrenia, and reelin enhances expression of AMPA and NMDA receptors alike. As such deficits in these two ionotropic glutamate receptors may be partially explained by altered reelin cascades. Neuregulin 1 (NRG1) deficits may also be involved in glutaminergic hypofunction as NRG1 hypofunction leads to schizophrenia-pattern behavior in mice; likely due in part to reduced NMDA signaling via Src family kinases (SFK) suppression.

== Role of synaptic pruning ==
Various neurotrophic factors dysregulate in schizophrenia and other mental disorders, namely BDNF; expression of which is lowered in schizophrenia as well as in major depression and bipolar disorder. BDNF regulates in an AMPA-dependent mechanism - AMPA and BDNF alike are critical mediators of growth cone survival. NGF, another neurotrophin involved in maintenance of synaptic plasticity is similarly seen in deficit.

Dopaminergic excess, classically understood to result in schizophrenia, puts oxidative stress on neurons; leading to inflammatory response and microglia activation. Similarly, toxoplasmosis infection in the CNS (positively correlated to schizophrenia) activates inflammatory cascades, also leading to microglia activation. The lipoxygenase-5 inhibitor minocycline has been seen to be marginally effective in halting schizophrenia progression. One of such inflammatory cascades' downstream transcriptional target, NF-κB, is observed to have altered expression in schizophrenia.

In addition, CB_{2} is one of the most widely distributed glial cell-expressed receptors, downregulation of this inhibitory receptor may increase global synaptic pruning activity. While difference in expression or distribution is observed, when the CB_{2} receptor is knocked out in mice, schizophreniform behaviors manifest. This may deregulate synaptic pruning processes in a tachyphlaxis mechanism wherein immediate excess CB_{2} activity leads to phosphorylation of the receptor via GIRK, resultant in β-arrestin-dependent internalization and subsequent trafficking to the proteasome for degradation.

== Role of endogenous antagonists ==
Alterations in production of endogenous NMDA antagonists such as agmatine and kynurenic acid have been shown in schizophrenia. Deficit in NMDA activity produces psychotomimetic effects, though it remains to be seen if the blockade of NMDA receptors via these agents is causative or actually mimetic of patterns resultant from monoaminergic disruption.

AMPA receptor, the most widely distributed receptor in the brain, mediates long-term potentiation (LTP) via activity-dependent modulation of AMPA density. GluR1 subunit-containing AMPA receptors are Ca2+ permeable while GluR2/3 subunit-positive receptors are nearly impermeable to calcium ions. In the regulated pathway, GluR1 dimers populate the synapse at a rate proportional to NMDA-ergic Ca2+ influx. In the constitutative pathway, GluR2/3 dimers populate the synapse at a steady state.

This forms a positive feedback loop, where a small trigger impulse degating NMDA from Mg2+ pore blockade results in calcium influx, this calcium influx then triggers trafficking of GluR1-containing(Ca2+ permeable) subunits to the PSD, such trafficking of GluR1-positive AMPA to the postsynaptic neuron allows for upmodulation of the postsynaptic neuron's calcium influx in response to presynaptic calcium influx. Robust negative feedback at NMDA from kynurenic acid, magnesium, zinc, and agmatine prevents runaway feedback.

Misregulation of this pathway would sympathetically dysregulate LTP via disruption of NMDA. Such alteration in LTP may play a role, specifically in negative symptoms of schizophrenia, in creation of more broad disruptions such as loss of brain volume; an effect of the disease which antidopaminergics actually worsen, rather than treat.

== Role of a7 nicotinic ==
Anandamide, an endocannabinoid, is an α7 receptor antagonist. Cigarettes, consumed far out of proportion by schizophrenics, contain nornitrosonicotine; a potent a7 antagonist. This may indicate α7 pentameter excess as a causative factor, or possibly as a method of self-medication to combat antipsychotic side effects. Cannabidiol, a FAAH inhibitor, increases levels in anandamide and may have antipsychotic effect; though results are mixed here as anandamide also is a cannabinoid and as such displays some psychotomimetic effect. However, α7 nicotinic agonists have been indicated as potential treatments for schizophrenia, though evidence is somewhat contradictory there is indication a7 nAChR is somehow involved in the pathogenesis of schizophrenia.

== Role of 5-HT ==
This deficit in activation also results in a decrease in activity of 5-HT_{1A} receptors in the raphe nucleus. This serves to increase global serotonin levels, as 5-HT_{1A} serves as an autoreceptor. The 5-HT_{1B} receptor, also acting as an autoreceptor, specifically within the striatum, but also parts of basal ganglia then will inhibit serotonin release. This disinhibits frontal dopamine release. The local deficit of 5-HT within the striatum, basal ganglia, and prefrontal cortex causes a deficit of excitatory 5-HT_{6} signalling. This could possibly be the reason antipsychotics sometimes are reported to aggravate negative symptoms as antipsychotics are 5HT_{6} antagonists. This receptor being primarily GABAergic, it causes an excess of glutamatergic, noradrenergic, dopaminergic, and cholinergic activity within the prefrontal cortex and the striatum. An excess of 5-HT_{7} signaling within the thalamus also creates too much excitatory transmission to the prefrontal cortex. Combined with another critical abnormality observed in those with schizophrenia: 5-HT_{2A} dysfunction, this altered signalling cascade creates cortical, thus cognitive abnormalities. 5-HT_{2A} allows a link between cortical, thus conscious, and the basal ganglia, unconscious. Axons from 5-HT_{2A} neurons in layer V of the cerebral cortex reach the basal ganglia, forming a feedback loop. Signalling from layer V of the cerebral cortex to the basal ganglia alters 5-HT_{2C} signalling. This feedback loop with 5-HT_{2A}/5-HT_{2C} is how the outer cortex layers can exert some control over our neuropeptides, specifically opioid peptides, oxytocin and vasopressin. This alteration in this limbic-layer V axis may create the profound change in social cognition (and sometimes cognition as a whole) that is observed in schizophrenia. However, genesis of the actual alterations is a much more complex phenomena.

== Role of inhibitory transmission ==
The cortico-basal ganglia-thalamo-cortical loop is the source of the ordered input necessary for a higher level upper cortical loop. Feedback is controlled by the inhibitory potential of the cortices via the striatum. Through 5-HT_{2A} efferents from layer V of the cortex transmission proceeds through the striatum into the globulus pallidus internal and substantia nigra pars compacta. This core input to the basal ganglia is combined with input from the subthalamic nucleus. The only primarily dopaminergic pathway in this loop is a reciprocal connection from the substantia nigra pars reticulata to the striatum.

Dopaminergic drugs such as dopamine releasing agents and direct dopamine receptor agonists create alterations in this primarily GABAergic pathway via increased dopaminergic feedback from the substantia nigra pars compacta to the striatum. However, dopamine also modulates other cortical areas, namely the VTA; with efferents to the amygdala and locus coeruleus, likely modulating anxiety and paranoid aspects of psychotic experience. As such, the glutamate hypothesis is probably not an explanation of primary causative factors in positive symptoms, but rather might possibly be an explanation for negative symptoms.

Dopamine hypothesis of schizophrenia elaborates upon the nature of abnormal lateral structures found in someone with a high risk for psychosis.

== Altered signalling cascades ==
Again, thalamic input from layer V is a crucial factor in the functionality of the human brain. It allows the two sides to receive similar inputs, thus be able to perceive the same world. In psychosis, thalamic input loses much of its integrated character: hyperactive core feedback loops overwhelm the ordered output. This is due to excessive D_{2} and 5-HT_{2A} receptors activity. This alteration in input to the top and bottom of the cortex. The altered 5-HT signal cascade enhances the strength of excitatory thalamic input from layer V. This abnormality, enhancing the thalamic-cortical transmission cascade versus the corticostriatal control, creates a feedback loop, resulting in abnormally strong basal ganglia output.

The root of psychosis (experiences that cannot be explained, even within their own mind) is when basal ganglia input to layer V overwhelms the inhibitory potential of the higher cortexies resulting from striatal transmission. When combined with the excess prefrontal, specifically orbitofrontal transmission, from the hippocampus, this creates a brain prone to falling into self reinforcing belief.

However, given a specific environment, a person with this kind of brain can create a self-reinforcing pattern of maladaptive behavior, from the altered the layer II/III and III/I axes, from the disinhibited thalamic output. Rationality is impaired, primarily as response to the deficit of oxytocin and excess of vasopressin from the abnormal 5HT_{2C} receptor activity.

Frontal cortex activity will be impaired, when combined with excess DA activity: the basis for the advancement of schizophrenia, but it is also the neurologic mechanism behind many other psychotic diseases as well. However, the genetic component is the primary source of the neurological abnormalities which leave one prone to psychological disorders. Specifically, there is much overlap between bipolar disorder and schizophrenia, and other psychotic disorders.

== Treatment ==
Alterations in serine racemase indicate that the endogenous NMDA agonist D-serine may be produced abnormally in schizophrenia and that d-serine may be an effective treatment for schizophrenia.

Schizophrenia is often treated by medications known as antipsychotics (or neuroleptics) that typically reduce dopaminergic activity. These medications have been seen to reduce positive symptoms, specifically persecutory delusions, and thus, researchers concluded that dopaminergic activity was linked to schizophrenic symptoms . Furthermore, dopaminergic drugs (dopamine agonists) induce hallucinations similar to those associated with schizophrenia . Dopaminergic drug abuse such as abuse of methamphetamine may result in a short lasting psychosis or provocation of a longer psychotic episode that may include symptoms of auditory hallucinations.

The typical antipsychotics are known to have significant risks of side effects that can increase over time, and only show clinical effectiveness in reducing positive symptoms. A 2006 systematic review investigated the efficacy of glutamatergic drugs as add-on:

Outcome	Findings in words	Findings in numbers	Quality of evidence
Global outcome
Relapse (add-on glycine)	At present it is not possible to be confident about the effect of adding the glutamatergic drug to standard antipsychotic treatment. Data supporting this finding are very limited.	RR 0.39 (0.02 to 8.73)	Very low
Service outcome
Hospital admission (add-on glycine)	There is no clarity about the benefits or otherwise of adding a glutamatergic drug to antipsychotics for outcomes about how much hospital/community care is used. Data supporting this finding are based on low quality evidence.	RR 2.63 (0.12 to 59.40)	Low
Mental state
No clinically significant improvement (add-on glycine)	There is no evidence of clear advantage of using add-on glutamatergic to standard antipsychotic medication. These findings are based on data of low quality.	RR 0.92 (0.79 to 1.08)	Low
Adverse effects
Constipation (add-on glycine or D-serine)	There is no clarity from very limited data. Additional glutamatergic could cause constipation or help avoid it. Data are very limited.	RR 0.61 (0.06 to 6.02)	Very low
Insomnia (add-on glycine or D-serine)	Additional glutamatergic may help or cause insomnia - it is not clear from the very limited data.	RR 0.61 (0.13 to 2.84)	Very low
Missing outcomes
Quality of life	This outcome was not reported in any studies		

Interestingly, though the neurological effects of antipsychotics (such as chlorpromazine hydrochloride) on brain biochemistry are almost instantaneous , schizophrenic patients treated with these drugs only see improvements in their symptoms after days to weeks .

== Psychotomimetic glutamate antagonists ==
Ketamine and PCP were observed to produce significant similarities to schizophrenia. Ketamine produces more similar symptoms (hallucinations, withdrawal) without observed permanent effects (other than ketamine tolerance). Both arylcyclohexamines have some(uM) affinity to D_{2} and as triple reuptake inhibitors. PCP is representative symptomatically, but does appear to cause brain structure changes seen in schizophrenia.

== Possible glutamate based treatment ==
An early clinical trial by Eli Lilly of the drug LY2140023 has shown potential for treating schizophrenia without the weight gain and other side-effects associated with conventional anti-psychotics. A trial in 2009 failed to prove superiority over placebo or Olanzapine, but Lilly explained this as being due to an exceptionally high placebo response. However, Eli Lilly terminated further development of the compound in 2012 after it failed in phase III clinical trials. This drug acts as a selective agonist at metabotropic mGluR2 and mGluR3 glutamate receptors (the mGluR3 gene has previously been associated with schizophrenia).

Studies of glycine (and related co-agonists at the NMDA receptor) added to conventional anti-psychotics have also found some evidence that these may improve symptoms in schizophrenia.

== Animal models ==
Research done on mice in early 2009 has shown that when the neuregulin-1\ErbB postsynaptic receptor genes are deleted, the dendritic spines of glutamate neurons initially grow, but break down during later development. This led to symptoms (such as disturbed social function, inability to adapt to predictable future stressors) that overlap with schizophrenia. This parallels the time delay for symptoms setting in with schizophrenic humans who usually appear to show normal development until early adulthood.
