= CDH15 =

Protein-coding gene in humans

Identifiers
- Aliases: CDH15, CDH14, CDH3, CDHM, MCAD, MRD3, cadherin 15
- External IDs: OMIM: 114019; MGI: 106672; GeneCards: CDH15

Gene location (Human)
Chr.	Chromosome 16 (human)
Band	16q24.3	Start	89,171,748 bp
Band	16q24.3	End	89,195,492 bp

Gene location (Mouse)
Chr.	Chromosome 8 (mouse)
Band	8 E1|8 71.99 cM	Start	123,574,705 bp
Band	8 E1|8 71.99 cM	End	123,594,136 bp
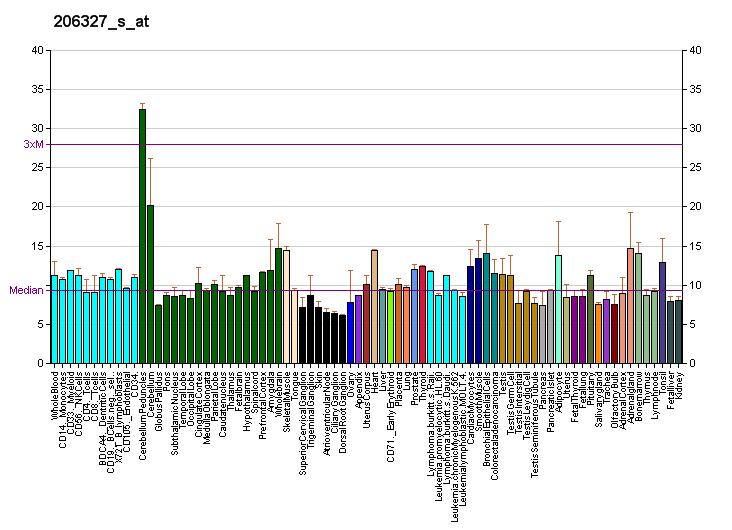

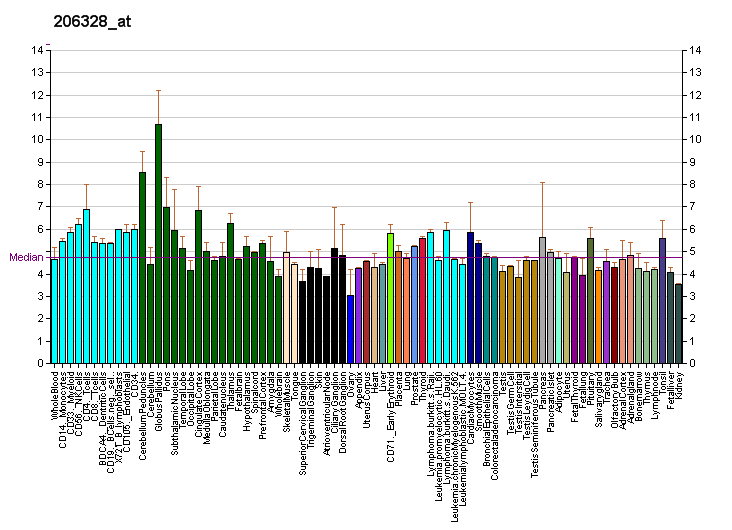
RNA expression pattern
Bgee	Human / Mouse (ortholog); Top expressed in: cerebellar hemisphere; right hemisphere of cerebellum; gastrocnemius muscle; muscle of thigh; Skeletal muscle tissue of rectus abdominis; glutes; tibialis anterior muscle; deltoid muscle; paraflocculus of cerebellum; tibia / Top expressed in: myotome; muscle of thigh; lumbar spinal ganglion; temporal muscle; triceps brachii muscle; vastus lateralis muscle; body of femur; ankle; internal carotid artery; sternocleidomastoid muscle; More reference expression data
BioGPS	More reference expression data
Gene ontology
Molecular function	calcium ion binding; protein binding; metal ion binding; cytoskeletal protein binding; protein homodimerization activity; cadherin binding
Cellular component	caveola; integral component of membrane; neuromuscular junction; plasma membrane; extracellular exosome; membrane; Golgi apparatus; cytosol; cell surface; catenin complex
Biological process	cell adhesion; adherens junction organization; positive regulation of muscle cell differentiation; homophilic cell adhesion via plasma membrane adhesion molecules; cell morphogenesis; cell-cell junction assembly; calcium-dependent cell-cell adhesion via plasma membrane cell adhesion molecules; cell-cell adhesion mediated by cadherin; cell-cell adhesion
Sources:Amigo / QuickGO
Orthologs
Databases	NCBI: entry; OMA: entry
Species	Human	Mouse
Entrez	1013	12555
Ensembl	ENSG00000129910	ENSMUSG00000031962
UniProt	P55291	P33146
RefSeq (mRNA)	NM_004933	NM_007662
RefSeq (protein)	NP_004924	NP_031688
Location (UCSC)	Chr 16: 89.17 – 89.2 Mb	Chr 8: 123.57 – 123.59 Mb
PubMed search
- Wikidata
View/Edit Human	View/Edit Mouse

Cadherin-15 is a protein that in humans is encoded by the CDH15 gene.

== Function ==
This gene is a member of the cadherin superfamily of genes, encoding calcium-dependent intercellular adhesion glycoproteins. Cadherins consist of an extracellular domain containing 5 cadherin domains, a transmembrane region, and a conserved cytoplasmic domain. Transcripts from this particular cadherin are expressed in myoblasts and upregulated in myotubule-forming cells. The protein is thought to be essential for the control of morphogenetic processes, specifically myogenesis, and may provide a trigger for terminal muscle cell differentiation.

== Interactions ==
CDH15 has been shown to interact with ARVCF.
