= Dopamine hypothesis of schizophrenia =

Scientific model

The dopamine hypothesis of schizophrenia or the dopamine hypothesis of psychosis is a model that attributes the positive symptoms of schizophrenia to a disturbed and hyperactive dopaminergic signal transduction. The model draws evidence from the observation that a large number of antipsychotics have dopamine-receptor antagonistic effects. The theory, however, does not posit dopamine overabundance as a complete explanation for schizophrenia. Rather, the overactivation of D2 receptors, specifically, is one effect of the global chemical synaptic dysregulation observed in this disorder.

== Introduction ==
Some researchers have suggested that dopamine systems in the mesolimbic pathway may contribute to the 'positive symptoms' of schizophrenia, whereas problems concerning dopamine function within the mesocortical pathway may be responsible for the 'negative symptoms', such as avolition and alogia. Abnormal expression, thus distribution of the D_{2} receptor between these areas and the rest of the brain may also be implicated in schizophrenia, specifically in the acute phase. Note that variation in distribution is observed within individuals, so abnormalities of this characteristic likely play a significant role in all psychological illnesses. Individual alterations are produced by differences within glutamatergic pathways within the limbic system, which are also implicated in other psychotic syndromes. Among the alterations of both synaptic and global structure, the most significant abnormalities are observed in the uncinate fasciculus and the cingulate cortex. The combination of these creates a profound dissymmetry of prefrontal inhibitory signaling, shifted positively towards the dominant side. Eventually, the cingulate gyrus becomes atrophied towards the anterior, due to long-term depression (LTD) and long-term potentiation (LTP) from the abnormally strong signals transversely across the brain. This, combined with a relative deficit in GABAergic input to Wernicke's area, shifts the balance of bilateral communication across the corpus callosum posteriorly. Through this mechanism, hemispherical communication becomes highly shifted towards the left/dominant posterior. As such, spontaneous language from Broca's can propagate through the limbic system to the tertiary auditory cortex. This retrograde signaling to the temporal lobes that results in the parietal lobes not recognizing it as internal results in the auditory hallucinations typical of chronic schizophrenia.

Significant cortical grey matter volume reductions are observed in this disorder. Specifically, the right hemisphere atrophies more, while both sides show a marked decrease in frontal and posterior volume. This indicates that abnormal synaptic plasticity occurs, where certain feedback loops become so potentiated, others receive little glutaminergic transmission. This is a direct result of the abnormal dopaminergic input to the striatum, thus (indirectly) disinhibition of thalamic activity. The excitatory nature of dopaminergic transmission means the glutamate hypothesis of schizophrenia is inextricably intertwined with this altered functioning. 5-HT also regulates monoamine neurotransmitters, including dopaminergic transmission. Specifically, the 5-HT2A receptor regulates cortical input to the basal ganglia and many typical and atypical antipsychotics are antagonists at this receptor. Several antipsychotics are also antagonists at the 5-HT2C receptor, leading to dopamine release in the structures where 5-HT2C is expressed; striatum, prefrontal cortex, nucleus accumbens, amygdala, hippocampus (all structures indicated in this disease), and currently thought to be a reason why antipsychotics with 5HT2C antagonistic properties improves negative symptoms. More research is needed to explain the exact nature of the altered chemical transmission in this disorder.

Recent evidence on a variety of animal models of psychosis, such as sensitization of animal behavior by amphetamine, or phencyclidine (PCP, Angel Dust), or by removing various genes (COMT, DBH, GPRK6, RGS9, RIIbeta), or making brain lesions in newborn animals, or delivering animals abnormally by Caesarian section, all induce a marked behavioural supersensitivity to dopamine and a marked rise in the number of dopamine D_{2} receptors in the high-affinity state for dopamine. This latter work implies that there are multiple genes and neuronal pathways that can lead to psychosis and that all these multiple psychosis pathways converge via the high-affinity state of the D2 receptor, the common target for all antipsychotics, typical or atypical. Combined with less inhibitory signalling from the thalamus and other basal ganglic structures, from atrophy the abnormal activation of the cingulate cortex, specifically around Broca's and Wernicke's areas, abnormal D_{2} agonism can facilitate the self-reinforcing, illogical patterns of language found in such patients. In schizophrenia, this feedback loop has progressed, which produced the widespread neural atrophy characteristic of this disease. Patients on neuroleptic or antipsychotic medication have significantly less atrophy within these crucial areas. As such, early medical intervention is crucial in preventing the advancement of these profound deficits in bilateral communication at the root of all psychotic disorders. Advanced, chronic schizophrenia can not respond even to clozapine, regarded as the most effective antipsychotic, as such, a cure for highly advanced schizophrenia is likely impossible through the use of any modern antipsychotics, so the value of early intervention cannot be stressed enough.

== Discussion ==
=== Evidence for the dopamine hypothesis ===
Stimulants such as amphetamine and cocaine increase the levels of dopamine in the synaptic space and exacerbate acute psychotic episodes in schizophrenic patients. It should be noted, however, that this does not occur when patients with schizophrenia are not in an acute psychotic state. In fact, low-dose amphetamine (10 mg) has been shown to improve auditory discrimination training in patients with schizophrenia. Repeated, high doses of amphetamine are neurotoxic to dopamine neurons, and can cause a psychotic syndrome resembling schizophrenia. Similarly, those treated with dopamine enhancing levodopa for Parkinson's disease can experience psychotic side effects mimicking the symptoms of schizophrenia. Up to 75% of patients with schizophrenia have increased signs and symptoms of their psychosis upon challenge with moderate doses of methylphenidate or amphetamine or other dopamine-like compounds, all given at doses at which control normal volunteers do not have any psychologically disturbing effects.

Some functional neuroimaging studies have also shown that, after taking amphetamine, patients diagnosed with schizophrenia show greater levels of dopamine release (particularly in the striatum) than non-psychotic individuals. However, the acute effects of dopamine stimulants include euphoria, alertness and over-confidence; these symptoms are more reminiscent of mania than schizophrenia. Since the 2000s, several PET studies have confirmed an altered synthesis capacity of dopamine in the nigrostriatal system demonstrating a dopaminergic dysregulation.

A group of drugs called the phenothiazines, including antipsychotics such as chlorpromazine, has been found to antagonize dopamine binding (particularly at receptors known as D_{2} dopamine receptors) and reduce positive psychotic symptoms. This observation was subsequently extended to other antipsychotic drug classes, such as butyrophenones including haloperidol. The link was strengthened by experiments in the 1970s which suggested that the binding affinity of antipsychotic drugs for D_{2} dopamine receptors seemed to be inversely proportional to their therapeutic dose. This correlation, suggesting that receptor binding is causally related to therapeutic potency, was reported by two laboratories in 1976.

People with schizophrenia appear to have a high rate of self-medication with nicotine; the therapeutic effect likely occurs through dopamine modulation by nicotinic acetylcholine receptors.

However, there was controversy and conflicting findings over whether postmortem findings resulted from drug tolerance to chronic antipsychotic treatment. Compared to the success of postmortem studies in finding profound changes of dopamine receptors, imaging studies using SPECT and PET methods in drug naive patients have generally failed to find any difference in dopamine D_{2} receptor density compared to controls. Comparable findings in longitudinal studies show: "Particular emphasis is given to methodological limitations in the existing literature, including lack of reliability data, clinical heterogeneity among studies, and inadequate study designs and statistic," suggestions are made for improving future longitudinal neuroimaging studies of treatment effects in schizophrenia A recent review of imaging studies in schizophrenia shows confidence in the techniques, while discussing such operator error. In 2007 one report said, "During the last decade, results of brain imaging studies by use of PET and SPECT in schizophrenic patients showed a clear dysregulation of the dopaminergic system."

Recent findings from meta-analyses suggest that there may be a small elevation in dopamine D_{2} receptors in drug-free patients with schizophrenia, but the degree of overlap between patients and controls makes it unlikely that this is clinically meaningful. While the review by Laruelle acknowledged more sites were found using methylspiperone, it discussed the theoretical reasons behind such an increase (including the monomer-dimer equilibrium) and called for more work to be done to 'characterise' the differences. In addition, newer antipsychotic medication (called atypical antipsychotic medication) can be as potent as older medication (called typical antipsychotic medication) while also affecting serotonin function and having somewhat less of a dopamine blocking effect. In addition, dopamine pathway dysfunction has not been reliably shown to correlate with symptom onset or severity. HVA levels correlate trendwise to symptoms severity. During the application of debrisoquin, this correlation becomes significant.

Giving a more precise explanation of this discrepancy in D_{2} receptor has been attempted by a significant minority. Radioligand imaging measurements involve the monomer and dimer ratio, and the 'cooperativity' model. Cooperativity is a chemical function in the study of enzymes. Dopamine receptors interact with their own kind, or other receptors to form higher order receptors such as dimers, via the mechanism of cooperativity. Philip Seeman has said: "In schizophrenia, therefore, the density of [11C] methylspiperone sites rises, reflecting an increase in monomers, while the density of [11C] raclopride sites remains the same, indicating that the total population of D_{2} monomers and dimers does not change." (In another place Seeman has said methylspiperone possibly binds with dimers) With this difference in measurement technique in mind, the above-mentioned meta-analysis uses results from 10 different ligands. Exaggerated ligand binding results such as SDZ GLC 756 (as used in the figure) were explained by reference to this monomer-dimer equilibrium.

According to Seeman, "...Numerous postmortem studies have consistently revealed D_{2} receptors to be elevated in the striata of patients with schizophrenia". However, the authors were concerned the effect of medication may not have been fully accounted for. The study introduced an experiment by Anissa Abi-Dargham et al. in which it was shown medication-free live people with schizophrenia had more D_{2} receptors involved in the schizophrenic process and more dopamine. Since then another study has shown such elevated percentages in D_{2} receptors is brain-wide (using a different ligand, which did not need dopamine depletion). In a 2009 study, Abi-Dargham et al. confirmed the findings of her previous study regarding increased baseline D_{2} receptors in people with schizophrenia and showing a correlation between this magnitude and the result of amphetamine stimulation experiments.

Some animal models of psychosis are similar to those for addiction – displaying increased locomotor activity. For those female animals with previous sexual experience, amphetamine stimulation happens faster than for virgins. There is no study on male equivalent because the studies are meant to explain why females experience addiction earlier than males.

Even in 1986 the effect of antipsychotics on receptor measurement was controversial. An article in Science sought to clarify whether the increase was solely due to medication by using drug-naive people with schizophrenia: "The finding that D_{2} dopamine receptors are substantially increased in schizophrenic patients who have never been treated with neuroleptic drugs raises the possibility that dopamine receptors are involved in the schizophrenic disease process itself. Alternatively, the increased D_{2} receptor number may reflect presynaptic factors such as increased endogenous dopamine levels (16). In either case, our findings support the hypothesis that dopamine receptor abnormalities are present in untreated schizophrenic patients." (The experiment used 3-N-[11C]methylspiperone – the same as mentioned by Seeman detects D_{2} monomers and binding was double that of controls.)

It is still thought that dopamine mesolimbic pathways may be hyperactive, resulting in hyperstimulation of D_{2} receptors and positive symptoms. There is also growing evidence that, conversely, mesocortical pathway dopamine projections to the prefrontal cortex might be hypoactive (underactive), resulting in hypostimulation of D_{1} receptors, which may be related to negative symptoms and cognitive impairment. The overactivity and underactivity in these different regions may be linked, and may not be due to a primary dysfunction of dopamine systems but to more general neurodevelopmental issues that precede them. Increased dopamine sensitivity may be a common final pathway. Gründer and Cumming assert that of those living with schizophrenia and other dopaminergic related illnesses, up to 25% of these patients may appear to have dopaminergic markers within the normal range.

Another finding is a six-fold excess of binding sites insensitive to the testing agent, raclopride; Seeman said this increase was probably due to the increase in D_{2} monomers. Such an increase in monomers may occur via the cooperativity mechanism which is responsible for D_{2}^{High} and D_{2}^{Low}, the supersensitive and lowsensitivity states of the D_{2} dopamine receptor. More specifically, "an increase in monomers, may be one basis for dopamine supersensitivity".

=== Genetic and other biopsychosocial risk factors ===
Genetic evidence has suggested that there may be genes, or specific variants of genes, that code for mechanisms involved in dopamine function, which may be more prevalent in people experiencing psychosis or diagnosed with schizophrenia. Genome-Wide Association studies identify frequently seen single nucleotide polymorphisms (SNP) that are associated with psychosis. Genetic variants found due to GWA studies may offer insight concerning impairments in dopaminergic function. Dopamine-related genes linked to psychosis in this way include COMT, DRD4, and AKT1.

While genetics play an important role in the occurrence of schizophrenia, other biopsychosocial factors must also be taken into consideration. While focusing on the risk of schizophrenia in second generation migrants, Hennsler and colleagues relay that the dopamine hypothesis of schizophrenia may be an explanation. Some migrants who have had adverse experiences in their host country, such as racism, xenophobia, and poor living conditions, were found to have high stress levels, which increased dopaminergic neurotransmission. This increase in dopaminergic neurotransmission can be seen in the striatum and amygdala, both of which are areas in the brain that process aversive stimuli.

=== Evidence against the dopamine hypothesis ===
Further experiments, conducted as new methods were developed (particularly the ability to use PET scanning to examine drug action in the brain of living patients) challenged the view that the amount of dopamine blocking was correlated with clinical benefit. These studies showed that some patients had over 90% of their D_{2} receptors blocked by antipsychotic drugs, but showed little reduction in their psychoses. This primarily occurs in patients who have had the psychosis for ten to thirty years. At least 90-95% of first-episode patients, however, respond to antipsychotics at low doses and do so with D_{2} occupancy of 60-70%. The antipsychotic aripiprazole occupies over 90% of D_{2} receptors, but this drug is both an agonist and an antagonist at D_{2} receptors.

Furthermore, although dopamine-inhibiting medications modify dopamine levels within minutes, the associated improvement in patient symptoms is usually not visible for at least several days, suggesting that dopamine may be indirectly responsible for the illness.

Similarly, the second generation of antipsychotic drugs – the atypical antipsychotics – were found to be just as effective as older typical antipsychotics in controlling psychosis, but more effective in controlling the negative symptoms, despite the fact that they have lower affinity for dopamine receptors than for various other neurotransmitter receptors. More recent work, however, has shown that atypical antipsychotic drugs such as clozapine and quetiapine bind and unbind rapidly and repeatedly to the dopamine D_{2} receptor. All of these drugs exhibit inverse agonistic effects at the 5-HT_{2A/2C} receptors, meaning serotonin abnormalities are also involved in the complex constellation of neurologic factors predisposing one to the self reinforcing language-based psychological deficits found in all forms of psychosis.

The excitatory neurotransmitter glutamate is now also thought to be associated with schizophrenia. Phencyclidine (also known as PCP or "Angel Dust") and ketamine, both of which block glutamate (NMDA) receptors, are known to cause psychosis at least somewhat resembling schizophrenia, further suggesting that psychosis and perhaps schizophrenia cannot fully be explained in terms of dopamine function, but may also involve other neurotransmitters.

Similarly, there is now evidence to suggest there may be a number of functional and structural anomalies in the brains of some people diagnosed with schizophrenia, such as changes in grey matter density in the frontal and temporal lobes. It appears, therefore, that there are multiple causes for psychosis and schizophrenia, including gene mutations and anatomical lesions. Many argue that other theories concerning the cause of schizophrenia may be more reliable in some cases, such as the glutamate hypothesis, GABA hypothesis, dysconnection hypothesis, and Bayesian inference hypothesis.

Psychiatrist David Healy has argued that drug companies have inappropriately promoted the dopamine hypothesis of schizophrenia as a deliberate and calculated simplification for the benefit of drug marketing. Healy, Joanna Moncrieff, and certain other researchers have argued that antipsychotics do not actually treat psychosis but rather simply blunt one's emotions and induce a state of psychological indifference. This in turn reduces the behavioral agitation associated with delusions. Moncrieff reviewed the evidence for the dopamine hypothesis of schizophrenia in 2009 and concluded that the data do not support it.

=== Relationship with glutamate ===
Research has shown the importance of glutamate receptors, specifically N-methyl-D-aspartate receptors (NMDARs), in addition to dopamine in the etiology of schizophrenia. Abnormal NMDAR transmission may alter communication between cortical regions and the striatum. Mice with only 5% of the normal levels of NMDAR's expressed schizophrenic-like behaviors seen in animal models of schizophrenia while mice with 100% of NMDAR's behaved normally. Schizophrenic behavior in low NMDAR mice has been effectively treated with antipsychotics that lower dopamine. NMDAR's and dopamine receptors in the prefrontal cortex are associated with the cognitive impairments and working memory deficits commonly seen in schizophrenia. Rats that have been given a NMDAR antagonist exhibit a significant decrease in performance on cognitive tasks. Rats given a dopamine antagonist (antipsychotic) experience a reversal of the negative effects of the NMDAR antagonist. Glutamate imbalances appear to cause abnormal functioning in dopamine. When levels of glutamate are low dopamine is overactive and results in the expression schizophrenic symptoms.

=== Combined networks of dopamine, serotonin, and glutamate ===
Psychopharmacologist Stephen M. Stahl suggested in a review of 2018 that in many cases of psychosis, including schizophrenia, three interconnected networks based on dopamine, serotonin, and glutamate - each on its own or in various combinations - contributed to an overexcitation of dopamine D2 receptors in the ventral striatum.

== See also ==
- Causes of schizophrenia
- Glutamate hypothesis of schizophrenia
- Latent inhibition
- Aberrant salience
