= Traumagenic neurodevelopmental model of psychosis =

The traumagenic neurodevelopmental (TN) model of psychosis synthesizes current knowledge of biological and psychological processes to describe the relationship between childhood trauma, ( psychological trauma) and psychosis. Proposed in 2001, the TN model suggests increased stress sensitivity observed among individuals experiencing psychotic symptoms may be attributed to trauma-induced neurodevelopmental changes during key developmental periods. Proposed as a partial explanation for the association between childhood adversity and psychosis, the TN model suggests observed increases in stress reactivity among individuals diagnosed with psychotic disorders may be attributed to trauma-induced neurological changes during sensitive developmental periods. As a result, the TN model underscores the importance of routine comprehensive assessments of childhood trauma histories when evaluating individuals presenting with psychotic symptoms for mental health services.

== Background ==
At the time of its original publication, the TN model suggested traumatic events experienced in early life may facilitate neurodevelopmental changes responsible for the increased stress sensitivity observed among individuals diagnosed with schizophrenia. This contrasted the popular Diathesis-Stress Model of Schizophrenia, which suggested the disorder results from the interaction of predisposed individual vulnerability and external stressors. Although both models have a biopsychosocial framework, they differ in the emphases placed on each component (i.e., biological, psychological and social factors). While authors of the TN model acknowledged the diathesis-stress model does account for situational and interpersonal stressors, they argued that research aimed at testing the model rarely investigated psychosocial explanations, lending to an overemphasis of the biological component of the model. Thus, at the time in which the TN model was proposed, diatheses contributing to the onset of schizophrenia were principally presumed to be heritable vulnerabilities. This resulted in stress (as a component of the conceptualization of psychosis) often being relegated to a natural consequence of the illness rather than its cause per se. The TN model proposed a more integrative approach to biopsychosocial formulations of schizophrenia that are consistent with multifactorial etiological models.

Although the original TN model specifically focused on the relationship between early traumatic events and schizophrenia symptoms it has since expanded to include all psychosis and psychotic disorders. Since its proposal, research of links between childhood trauma and psychosis has proliferated, resulting in numerous studies (using both human subjects and animal-models) providing both direct and indirect support of the TN model. Importantly, while the TN model suggests the psychological sequelae of childhood trauma may initiate neurodevelopmental changes resulting in psychopathology, it is not indicative of brain disease. This is a marked contrast from previous popular beliefs that the biological etiology of psychosis rendered it largely irreversible and untreatable, aside from pharmacotherapy-based symptom management. This model also reveals important clinical implications in the primary prevention of psychosis. Proponents of the TN model of psychosis suggest that targeting populations at-risk for experiencing childhood trauma with prevention-focused interventions would lead to profound decreases in the incidence of psychosis. Similarly, the TN model has also emphasized promotion of childhood trauma screening among individuals presenting with psychotic symptoms, as it can help to inform and adapt evidence-based trauma-informed therapeutic interventions aimed at addressing the specific needs of individual clients.

== Overview ==
The central hypothesis of the TN model suggests that for some individuals experiencing psychosis, heightened sensitivity to stress may be mediated by childhood trauma. Alterations in increased stress reactivity are expected to manifest as dysregulation of physiological mechanisms responsible for maintaining adaptive stress responses (i.e., allostasis). This is supported by evidence of analogous irregularities in stress reactivity among individuals diagnosed with schizophrenia and children who have experienced trauma. More specifically, both individuals diagnosed with schizophrenia and traumatized children exhibit hyperresponsivity of the hypothalamic-pituitary-adrenal (HPA) axis, which when activated results in a concomitant hormone cascade that regulates the physiological stress response.

In addition to abnormal endocrine stress responses, neurotransmitter abnormalities are also observed among both individuals experiencing psychosis and those with a history of childhood trauma. For example, alterations are observed in dopamine (DA) and serotonin (5-HT) receptor expression, in addition to increased catecholamine (epinephrine, norepinephrine and DA) synthesis. Further, many similarities in structural brain changes are also observed among these groups (e.g., hippocampal damage, enlarged ventricles, cerebral atrophy and asymmetry).

== Criticisms ==
A criticism of the TN model is that most individuals who experience childhood trauma do not develop psychotic symptoms. Many survivors of childhood trauma recover without persistent adverse effects. Further, childhood trauma is a known predictor of both medical and psychological disorders, many of which often co-occur with psychosis. Whether childhood trauma is robustly linked to a specific diagnosis relative to others remains to be elucidated. Despite this ambiguity in its strength as a predictor, the relationship between childhood trauma and psychosis is remains significant even after controlling for psychological comorbidities. Though equifinality may seem counter-intuitive, it is consistent with multifactorial etiological conceptualizations of psychosis to which the TN model is compatible.

Similarly, not all individuals presenting with psychotic symptoms have experienced childhood trauma. As noted, childhood trauma is associated with many deleterious psychological outcomes, including affect, substance use, and personality disorders. The multifinality of trauma may be explained by moderating variables such as type, frequency, duration, severity, and/or age at time of trauma. In addition to being dose-dependent, the effect of trauma has also been shown to be cumulative, in which multiple traumatic experiences can aggregate, enhancing downstream adverse consequences. Protective factors, such as social support and resiliency, have been shown to ameliorate the effects of trauma, thereby altering its potential long-term outcome.

Trauma by itself is neither required nor independently capable of inducing psychotic symptoms. Though viewed as a criticism of the TN model, this lack of specificity has been cited by proponents as having important theoretical implications. While the TN model may not suggest trauma is necessary for the development of psychotic disorders, research supporting this model opposes previous paradigms that the etiology of psychosis is purely biological in origin. Rather, the TN model suggests psychosis may be as influenced by psychosocial factors as other mental health illnesses (e.g., major depression) with the strength of the relationship varying across individuals and life experiences. This supports integrative multifactorial models and transdiagnostic approaches in the investigation of the etiology of psychosis, suggesting significantly more research investigating psychosocial influences in the relationship between trauma and psychosis should be conducted.
