= Death from laughter =

Cause of death

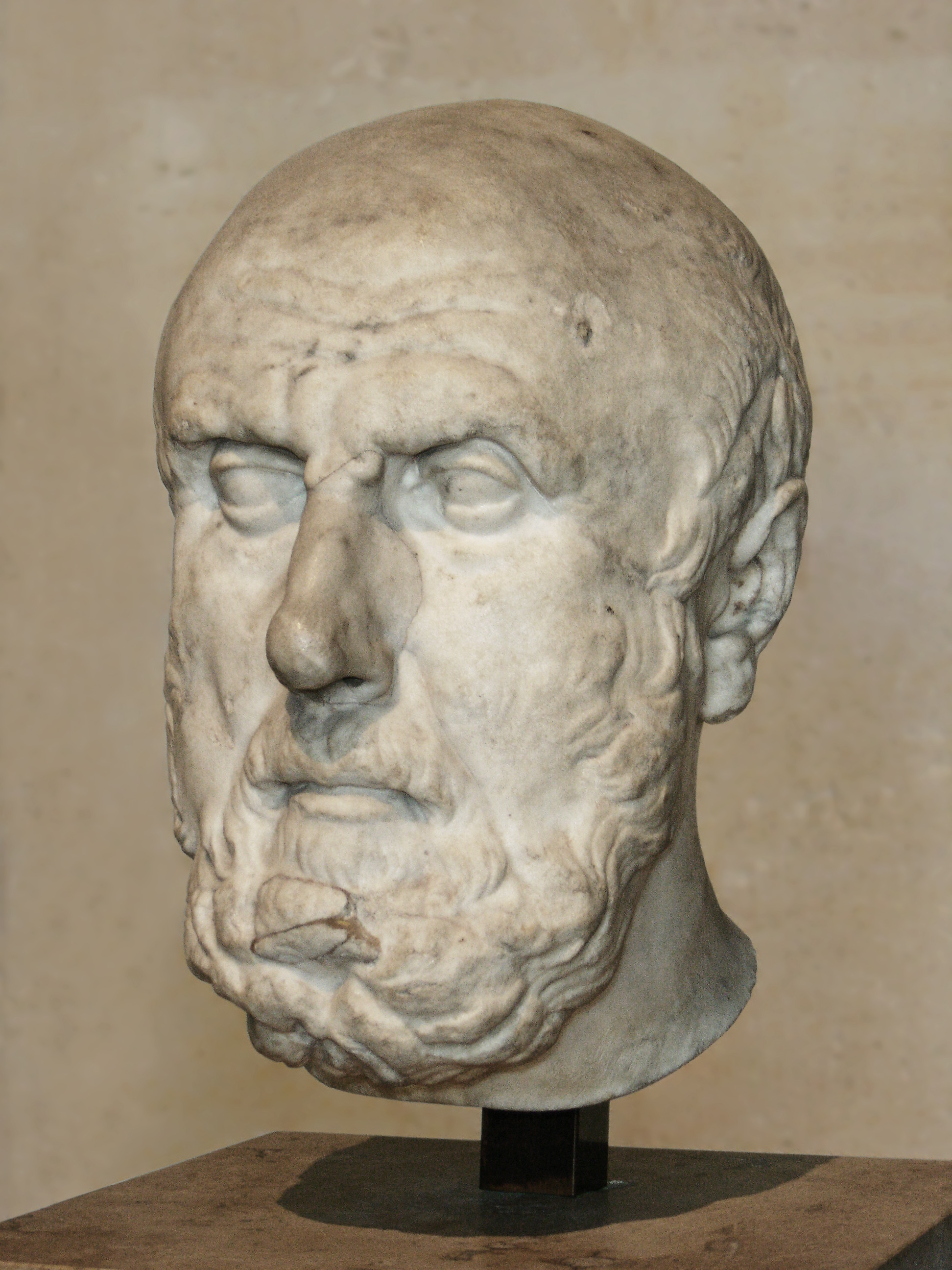
Chrysippus allegedly died of laughter after witnessing a donkey eating his figs.

Death from laughter is a rare form of death, usually resulting from either cardiac arrest or asphyxiation, that has itself been caused by a fit of laughter. Though uncommon, death by laughter has been recorded from the times of ancient Greece to modern times.

Usually, the phrase "dying from laughter" is used as a hyperbole.

== Pathophysiology ==
Laughter is normally harmless. Typically, laughter is controlled by two systems in the brain: an involuntary system that involves the amygdala and a voluntary system that involves the premotor opercular areas. However, death may result from several pathologies that deviate from benign laughter. Infarction of the pons and the medulla oblongata in the brain may cause the pseudobulbar affect. Asphyxiation caused by laughter leads the body to shut down from the lack of oxygen.

Laughter can cause atonia and collapse ("gelastic syncope"), which in turn can cause trauma. Gelastic seizures can be due to focal lesions to the hypothalamus. Depending upon the size of the lesion, the emotional lability may be a sign of an acute condition, and not itself the cause of the fatality. Gelastic syncope has also been associated with the cerebellum.

== Notable cases ==
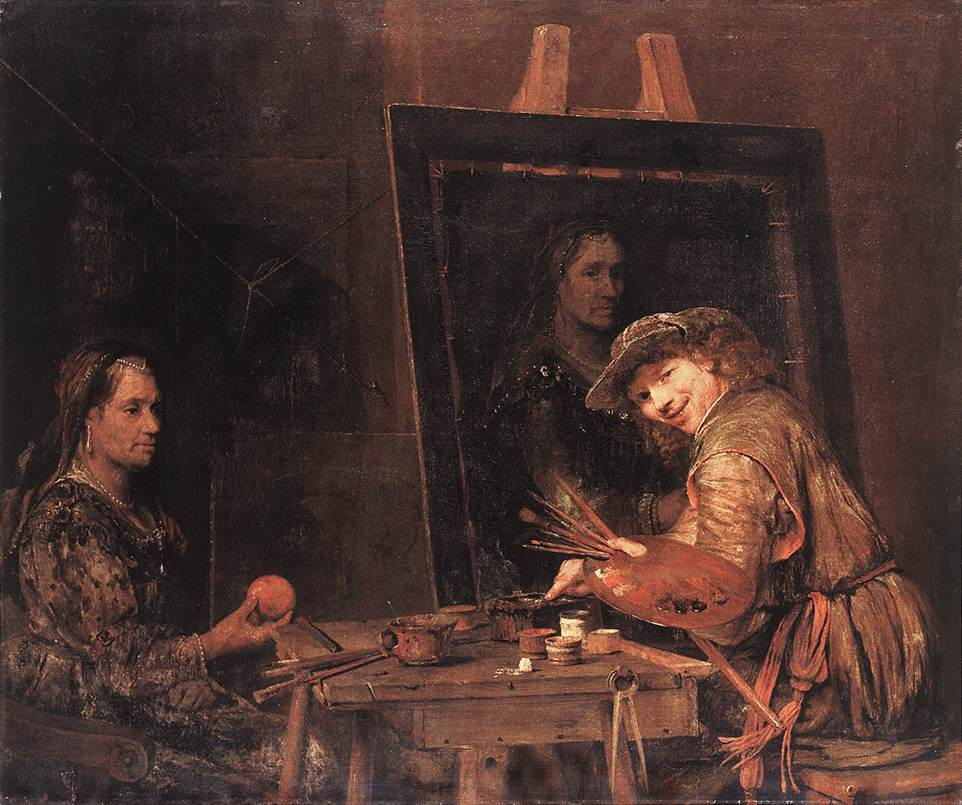
Arent de Gelder, Self-Portrait as Zeuxis Portraying an Ugly Old Woman (1685)

- Zeuxis, a 5th-century BC Greek painter, is said to have died laughing at the humorous way in which he painted an old woman.
- Chrysippus, also known as "the man who died from laughing at his joke", an influential 3rd-century BC Greek Stoic philosopher, reportedly died of laughter after he saw a donkey eating his fermented figs; he told a slave to give the donkey undiluted wine to wash them down, and then, "having laughed too much, he died" (Diogenes Laërtius 7.185).
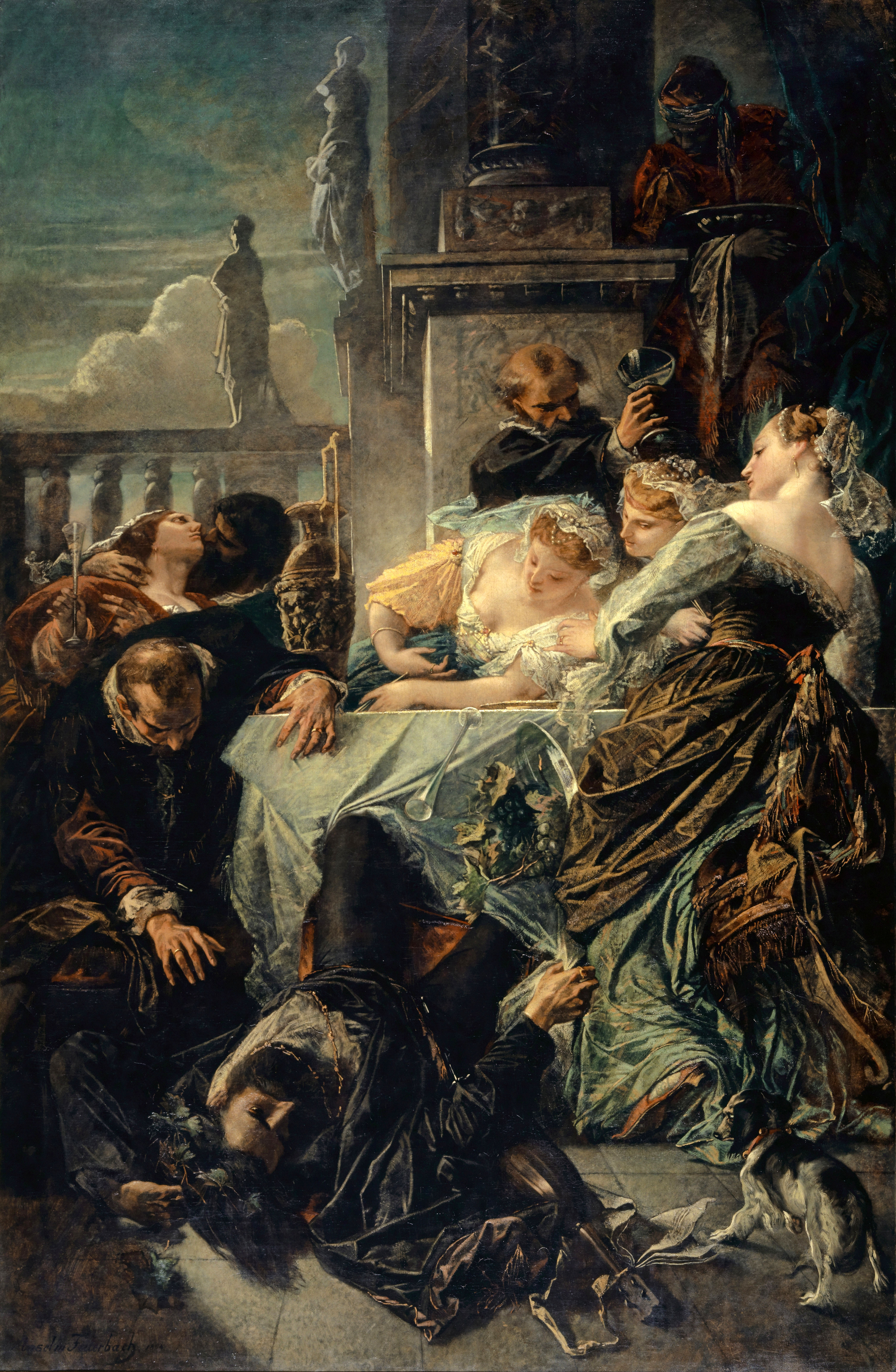
  Der Tod des Dichters Pietro Aretino (The Death of the Poet Pietro Aretino) by Anselm Feuerbach
- In 1410, King Martin of Aragon is said to have died from a combination of indigestion and uncontrollable laughter.
- In 1556, Pietro Aretino "is said to have died of suffocation from laughing too much". The more mundane truth may be that he died from a stroke or heart attack.
- In 1660, Thomas Urquhart, the Scottish aristocrat, polymath, and first translator of François Rabelais' writings into English, is said to have died laughing upon hearing that Charles II had taken the throne.
- On June 22, 1910, Thomas Henry Brown, a saloon employee from Marysville, Montana, died from violent laughter after spotting two nickels and a dime on the floor in his saloon and began laughing continuously at his good fortune for minutes. He fell to his death after his last laugh.
- On October 14, 1920, 56-year-old Arthur Cobcroft, a dog trainer from Loftus Street, Leichhardt, Australia, was reading a five-year-old newspaper and was amused at the prices for some commodities in 1915 as compared to 1920. He made a remark to his wife regarding this and burst into laughter, and in the midst of it, he collapsed and died. A doctor surnamed Nixon was called in, and stated that the death was due to heart failure, brought by excessive laughter.
- On February 14, 1928, a 46-year-old Glasgow, Scotland man named William F. Sangster, visited Toronto, Ontario for a business trip while residing in Vancouver, British Columbia. After a brief stop at The Omni King Edward Hotel, he walked to the Tivoli Theatre, where he went to see Charlie Chaplin's The Circus. During the movie with roars of laughter, one moviegoer told the management to call a doctor after witnessing Sangster passing out from his seat from laughing continuously over Chaplin's antics. Doctors declared him dead after arrival.
- During the night of October 30, 1965 in Manila, Philippines, a 24-year-old carpenter who was well-known for making his companions laugh was telling jokes to his friends. The joke, which the carpenter's friends told police, was so funny that it caused the carpenter to fall in an uncontrollable fit of laughter from which he then fainted; he was brought to the hospital, but died before he could be given medical help. The book The Big Book of Boy Stuff by Bart King recounts the incident in anecdotal form, where the carpenter was instead told the joke by his friends rather than himself, and "laughed until he cried, collapsed, and then died".
- On March 24, 1975, Alex Mitchell, from King's Lynn, England, died laughing while watching the "Kung Fu Kapers" episode of The Goodies. After 25 minutes of continuous laughter, Mitchell slumped on the sofa and died from heart failure. His widow later sent the Goodies a letter thanking them for making Mitchell's final moments of life so pleasant. Diagnosis of his granddaughter in 2012 of having the inheritable long QT syndrome (a heart rhythm abnormality) suggests that Mitchell may have died of a cardiac arrest caused by the same condition.
- In 1989, during the initial run of the film A Fish Called Wanda, a 71-year-old Danish audiologist named Ole Bentzen reportedly laughed himself to death.
- On August 19, 2003, Damnoen Saen-um, 52, an ice cream truck driver in Mueang Phuket district, Thailand, died laughing while asleep. The cause of death was unclear as he was in good health, but doctors said it was likely heart failure.

== In fiction ==
- In the movie, Mary Poppins, the banker, Mr. Dawes Sr. (played by Dick Van Dyke) is said to have died laughing.
- "The Three Infernal Jokes", a short story in The Last Book of Wonder (1916) by Lord Dunsany, about three jokes "which shall make all who hear them simply die of laughter".
- "The Funniest Joke in the World", episode of British sketch comedy Monty Python's Flying Circus, which revolves around a joke so funny that anybody who hears it promptly laughs themselves to death.
- In the 1988 fantasy comedy film Who Framed Roger Rabbit, the weasels of the Toon Patrol literally die laughing. Judge Doom mentions earlier in the film that this happened to their hyena cousins.
- "The Stand In", episode of American comedy Seinfeld, which features Jerry Seinfeld telling a joke to a hospital patient who then suddenly dies from laughter.
- Infinite Jest (1996), a novel by David Foster Wallace in which the meta-narrative includes a film so entertaining that those who see it lose all interest in anything else, and die.
- The Clean House, a play where dying of laughter is a reoccurring theme.
- "Scott Tenorman Must Die", episode of South Park, which features Kenny McCormick dying from laughing at a humiliating video of Eric Cartman.
- On the television series 1000 Ways to Die, a semi-fictionalized case, based on some of these actual deaths, was dramatized as "way to die" number 302, "Funny Boned", in the season 1 finale "I See Dead People (and They're Cracking Me Up)"; the fictional incident, claimed to take place on January 18/19, 1997, follows a pub patron named Chuck, who enjoys telling and hearing jokes, hearing one particular one so funny he simply could not stop laughing after hearing it, even after leaving the pub and returning the following day; by this time, he had been laughing for over 36 straight hours, and it proved such a strain on his heart that he dropped dead in the pub of a heart attack.
- "Parallel Play" episode of the television series Six Feet Under, a young girl laughs so hard she falls off her bed and breaks her neck while placing prank calls with friends. She dies shortly after.

== See also ==
- Kuru, also known as "laughing sickness"
- Laughter-induced syncope
- List of unusual deaths
- Paradoxical laughter
- Tickle torture
