= Knismesis and gargalesis =

Scientific terms for tickling

Knismesis and gargalesis are the scientific terms, coined in 1897 by psychologists G. Stanley Hall and Arthur Allin, used to describe the two types of tickling. Knismesis refers to the light, feather-like type of tickling. This type of tickling generally does not induce laughter and is often accompanied by an itching sensation. Gargalesis refers to harder, laughter-inducing tickling, and involves the repeated application of high pressure to sensitive areas.

While the two terms are used in academic papers, they do not appear in many dictionaries and their origin is rarely declared. The term knismesis comes from the Ancient Greek κνισμός (knismós) meaning 'itching'. The term gargalesis stems from the Ancient Greek γαργαλίζω (gargalízō) meaning 'to tickle'. The suffix -esis is used to form nouns of action or process.

== Knismesis ==
The knismesis phenomenon requires low levels of stimulation to sensitive parts of the body, and can be triggered by a light touch or by a light electric current. Knismesis can also be triggered by crawling insects or parasites, prompting scratching or rubbing at the ticklish spot, thereby removing the pest. It is possible that this function explains why knismesis produces a similar response in many different kinds of animals. In a famous example, described in Peter Benchley's Shark!, it is possible to tickle the area just under the snout of a great white shark, putting it into a near-hypnotic trance.

== Gargalesis ==
The gargalesis type of tickle works on primates (which include humans), and possibly on other species. For example, ultrasonic vocalizations described as "chirping", which play into social behavior and even have therapeutic effects, are reported in rats in response to human tickling. However, adult female rats may find the tickling sensation adverse. Because the nerves involved in transmitting "light" touch and itch differ from those nerves that transmit "heavy" touch, pressure and vibration, it is possible that the difference in sensations produced by the two types of tickle is due to the relative proportion of itch sensation versus touch sensation. While it is possible to trigger a knismesis response in oneself, it is usually impossible to produce gargalesthesia, the gargalesis tickle response, in oneself. Hypergargalesthesia is the condition of extreme sensitivity to tickling.
