= Dirk de Ridder =

Dirk de Ridder may refer to:

- Dirk de Ridder (sailor)
- Dirk De Ridder (neurosurgeon)
