= Paradoxical laughter =

Exaggerated expression of humour

Paradoxical laughter is an exaggerated expression of humour which is unwarranted by external events. It may be uncontrollable laughter which may be recognised as inappropriate by the person involved. It is associated with mental illness, such as mania, hypomania or schizophrenia, schizotypal personality disorder and can have other causes. Paradoxical laughter is indicative of an unstable mood, often caused by the pseudobulbar affect, which can quickly change to anger and back again, on minor external cues.

This type of laughter can also occur at times when the fight-or-flight response may otherwise be evoked.

== Causes ==
Paradoxical laughter has been consistently identified as a recurring emotional-cognitive symptom in schizophrenia diagnosis. Closely linked to paradoxical laughter is the symptom; inappropriate affect, defined by the APA Dictionary of Psychology as "emotional responses that are not in keeping with the situation or are incompatible with expressed thoughts or wishes". An example of inappropriate affect with paradoxical laughter may be; expressions of joy when told about the death of a loved one. Inappropriate affect in schizophrenia includes, but is not limited to, paradoxical laughter, it also may involve unexpected bouts of aggression, sudden displays of sadness or undefinably bizarre behaviour.

Inappropriate affect officially falls in the category of a negative symptom in schizophrenia, measured on the SANS Scale when a diagnosis is made. However, some dispute this and argue inappropriate affect does not suitably fall in the positive-negative symptom dichotomy. Paradoxical laughter and other inappropriate emotional expressions were defining features of disorganised schizophrenia - one of five sub-types of schizophrenia previously defined in the DSM-IV. The latest version DSM-V (2013), no longer recognises different types of schizophrenia.

Research suggests that inappropriate affect, including paradoxical laughter, occurs due to a diminished ability for recognising facial expressions in schizophrenic patients. Patients with greater scoring on inappropriate affect, using the SANS measure, have been found to show a lower ability in recognising facial expressions measured through the Florida Affect Battery. This suggests that deficits in facial expression recognition are what leads schizophrenic patients to behave in bizarre or inappropriate ways, such that, the inability to make sense of emotional cues results in mismatching or confused expressions. This is linked to the idea of affective attunement, defined as, "the ability of one person to respond to another person's expressed feelings by matching the duration, intensity and rhythm of their emotional expressions". Social interactions can break down when one person fails to sensitively respond to another's emotional signals. Because schizophrenics have an inhibited ability in recognising facial expressions they struggle to affectively relate to and communicate with others, in this sense, inappropriate affect can be recognised as a consequence of a restricted capacity for affective attunement. Deficits in affective perception have also been linked with autism spectrum disorder. A number of studies have recognised inappropriate affect and other co-morbid symptoms present in both autism and schizophrenia, contributing to the idea that the two syndromes may in reality be opposite ends of a single spectrum.

Corroborating evidence which measured schizophrenic patients' affective recognition, found a significant negative correlation with prevalence of inappropriate social and sexual behaviours and scoring on an affective recognition test. The study also found lower scores on the test were indicative of wider impoverished interpersonal relations and limited community participation, further suggesting deficits in affective attunement. After adjusting for intelligence and illness severity ratings, a strong correlation was still observed, suggesting inhibited affective recognition is linked and possibly causally related to the inappropriate affective and behavioural displays, including paradoxical laughter, in schizophrenic patients.

Techniques involving precise facial muscle observations have also been used to measure inappropriate affect. When participants were asked to make specific facial expressions, researchers identified consistent differences between schizophrenics and controls. Between schizophrenic patients, a much more diverse and inconsistent display of emotions was observed compared to controls. As the trials were repeated, patients elicited expressions that became less and less emotive, suggesting the emergence of blunted affect.

=== Neuroimaging ===
Several studies have examined inappropriate affect through imaging techniques observing regional brain abnormalities. Using fMRI techniques to measure activation across the brain, one experiment had patients reacting to and interacting with affective-facial stimuli. Two tasks were used: a discrimination task involving matching the correct emotion to a choice between two expressions, and a labelling task where patients had to verbally identify an emotion with a target facial expression. Compared to healthy controls, the schizophrenic patients showed significantly lower activation in the anterior cingulate on a discrimination task and lower activation in the amygdala-hippocampal area on a labelling task. The deficits in these regions present an explanation for the impoverished facial expression recognition in schizophrenics. When the target expression became more ambiguous, healthy controls showed a greater increase in activation in the right gyrus frontalis medialis, while schizophrenics showed consistently low levels of activation in this region. This evidence suggests that abnormalities in the anterior cingulate and amygdala may be responsible for displays of inappropriate affect.

Other researchers also recognise the important role of the amygdala. Using a three-group experimental design, researchers compared levels of activation in the amygdalae of schizophrenics, their non-affected brothers and healthy controls. Using fMRI imaging, they found schizophrenic patients showed lowest activation in the amygdala when inducing a sad mood and lowest activation in the left thalamus for a task inducing happy mood, out of all three groups. The latter finding is theorised to be caused by amygdala dysfunction given the high levels of inter-connectivity between these regions which form part of the limbic system. Non-affected brothers also showed reduced regional activation during the task, compared to the healthy controls matched on key characteristics. This suggests that regional brain abnormalities linked to inappropriate affect, have a genetic foundation which, to a smaller degree, affect relatives of schizophrenics also.

== Prevalence ==
Most clinical research indicates a greater prevalence of blunted affect in schizophrenics as opposed to inappropriate affect. However, studies throughout the 20th and 21st Century have documented and investigated its recurrence as a symptom linked to schizophrenia.

Observations of paradoxical laughter in schizophrenia date back to the 1940s. The subjective experience of patients was assessed to find inappropriate laughter most common at the early stage of schizophrenia. Through interviews it was found laughter was used by patients as a means to relieve built-up mental tension. Patients reported confusion in observing their environment causing cognitive strain and so used laughter as a way to release the tension and return to a blunted sense of feeling.

More recent observations have found inappropriate affect to be specifically present during the early stages of the illness. Findings recorded paradoxical laughter most prevalent in the period of schizophrenia closely after onset, identifying a significant negative correlation between age of onset and chances of developing inappropriate affective symptoms. More specifically, very early onset patients had a much higher incidence of inappropriate affect (87.5%) compared to later onset patients (41.3%). The correlation was significant for both males and females though stronger for male patients.

== See also ==
- Death from laughter
- Joker (2019 film)
- Laughter
- List of paradoxes
- Disorganized schizophrenia
