= G. Stanley Hall =

American psychologist and educator (1844–1924)

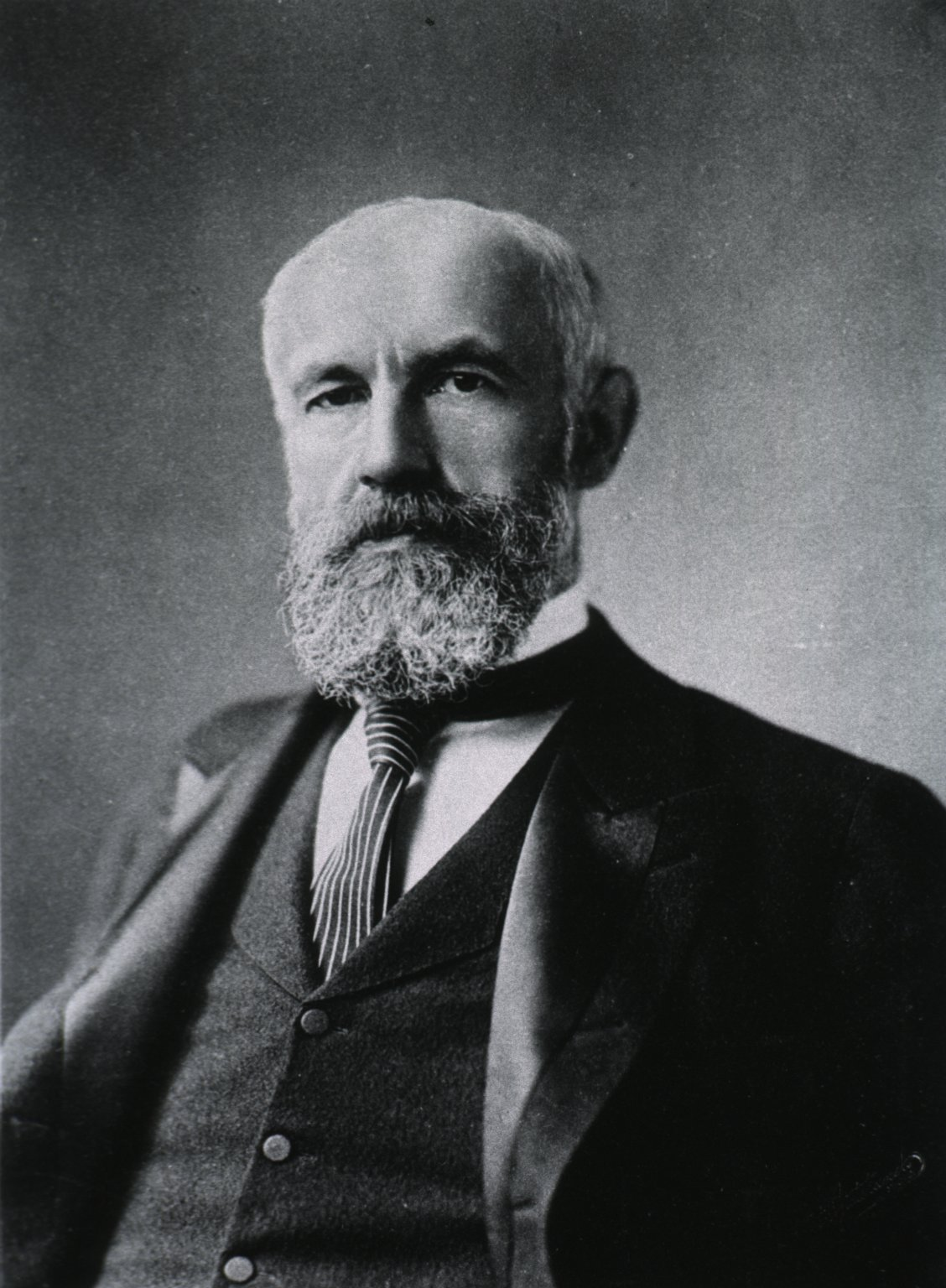
- Granville Stanley Hall by Frederick Gutekunst, circa 1910
- Born: Granville Stanley Hall; February 1, 1844; Ashfield, Massachusetts, U.S.
- Died: April 24, 1924 (aged 80); Worcester, Massachusetts, U.S.
- Education: Williams College; Harvard University; University of Berlin
- Scientific career
- Fields: Psychology
- Workplaces: Antioch College; Johns Hopkins University; Clark University
- Doctoral advisor: William James
- Doctoral students: William Lowe Bryan, Frederic Lister Burk

Granville Stanley Hall (February 1, 1844 – April 24, 1924) was an American psychologist and educator who earned the first doctorate in psychology awarded in the United States of America. His interests focused on human life span development and evolutionary theory. Hall was the first president of the American Psychological Association and the first president of Clark University. A 2002 survey by Review of General Psychology ranked Hall as the 72nd most cited psychologist of the 20th century, in a tie with Lewis Terman.

== Biography ==
=== Early life ===
Born in Ashfield, Massachusetts, Hall grew up on a farm with his parents, Granville Bascom Hall, who served on the Massachusetts legislature, and Abigail Beals, who attended school at Albany Female Seminary and went on to become a teacher herself. As an adolescent, Hall experienced frequent nocturnal emissions. He spent much of his time reading and taking advantage of the educational opportunities he could gain from his parents and the local schools. At a young age, he was interested in animals and bodily skills. By the age of 16, he began to teach other students, most of whom were older than he was

=== Education and early career ===
Hall attended Williston Seminary and graduated from Williams College in 1867, then studied at the Union Theological Seminary. Inspired by Wilhelm Wundt's Principles of Physiological Psychology, Hall pursued doctoral studies at Harvard University, where he met William James, an adjunct professor who had just taught the nation's first psychology class. In 1878, Hall earned his doctorate in psychology from Harvard, the first psychology doctorate awarded in the United States of America. Afterward, Hall could find no academic jobs available in psychology, so he went to Europe to study at the University of Berlin, and spent a brief time in Wundt's Leipzig laboratory in 1879.

He began his career by teaching English and philosophy at Antioch College in Yellow Springs, Ohio, and then teaching history of philosophy at Williams College in Massachusetts. Following successful lecture series at Harvard and Johns Hopkins University, Hall secured a position in the philosophy department at Johns Hopkins, teaching psychology and pedagogy. He remained at Johns Hopkins from 1882 to 1888 and, in 1883, began the first formal American psychology laboratory. There, Hall objected to the emphasis on teaching traditional subjects, e.g., Latin, mathematics, science and history, in high school, arguing instead that high school should focus more on the education of adolescents than on preparing students for college.

Hall was elected a member of the American Antiquarian Society in 1888.

=== Later career (psychology) ===
In 1887, Hall founded the American Journal of Psychology, and in 1892 was elected the first president of the American Psychological Association. In 1889 he was named the first president of Clark University, a post he filled until 1920. During his 31 years as president, Hall remained intellectually active. He was instrumental in the development of educational psychology, and attempted to determine the effect adolescence has on education. He was also responsible for inviting Sigmund Freud and Carl Jung to visit and deliver a lecture series in 1909 at the Clark University Vicennial Conference on Psychology and Pedagogy. Hall promised Freud an honorary degree from Clark University in exchange, and the two shared the same beliefs on sex and adolescence. This was Freud's first and only visit to America and the biggest conference held at Clark University. It was also the most controversial conference, given that Freud's research was based on theories that Hall's colleagues criticized as non-scientific.

In 1917, Hall published a book on religious psychology, Jesus the Christ in the Light of Psychology, in which he sought to identify universal psychological trends in the Gospels. This was his least successful work. In 1922, at the age of 78, he published the book Senescence, a book on aging.

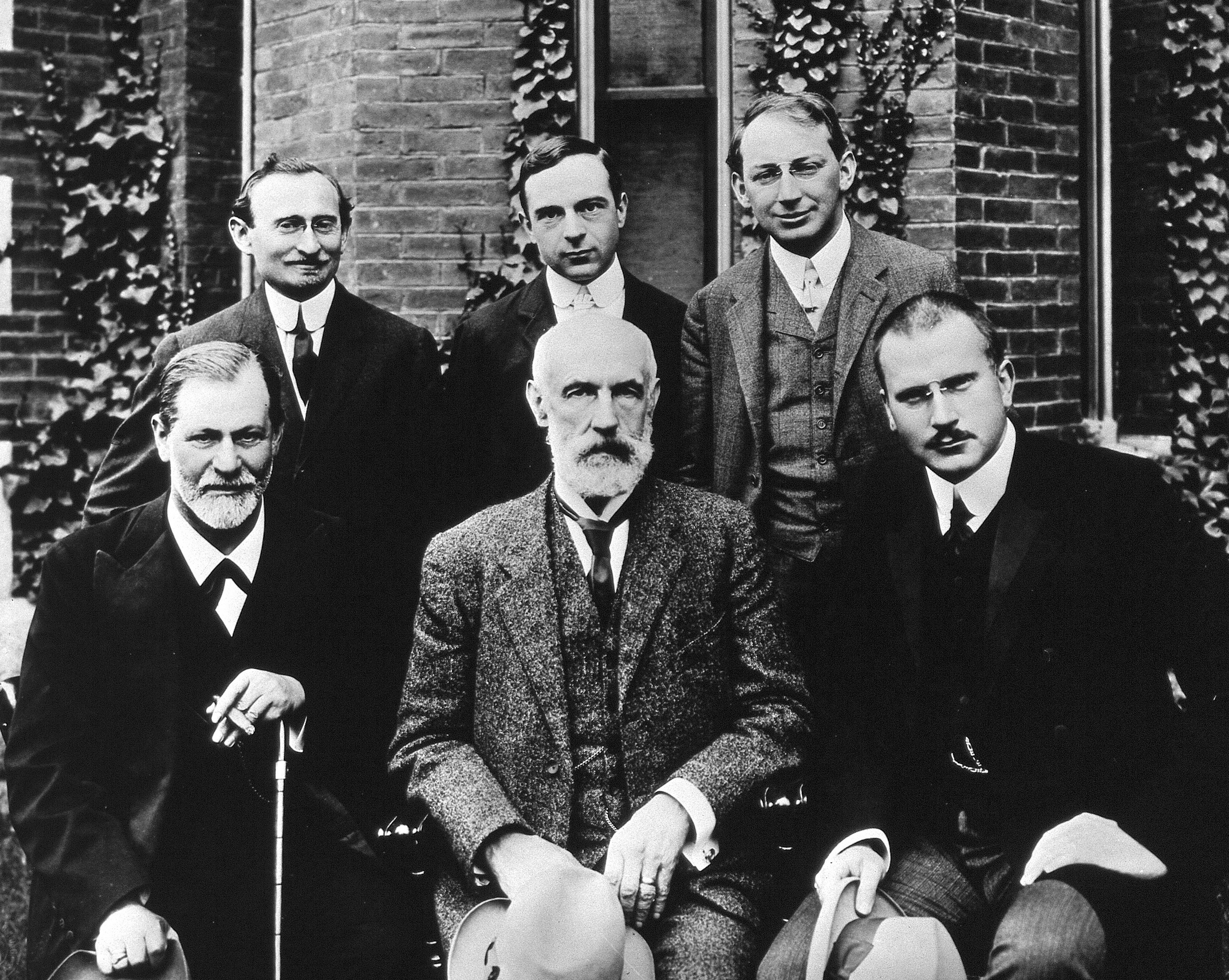
Group photo (1909) at Clark University. Front row: Sigmund Freud, G. Stanley Hall, C. G. Jung; back row: Abraham A. Brill, Ernest Jones, Sándor Ferenczi.

Darwin's theory of evolution and Ernst Haeckel's recapitulation theory were large influences on Hall's career. These ideas prompted Hall to examine aspects of childhood development in order to learn about the inheritance of behavior. The subjective character of these studies made their validation impossible. He believed that as children develop, their mental capabilities resemble those of their ancestors and so they develop over a lifetime the same way that species develop over eons. Hall believed that the process of recapitulation could be sped up through education and force children to reach modern standards of mental capabilities in a shorter length of time. His work also delved into controversial portrayals of the differences between women and men, as well as the concept of racial eugenics. While Hall was a proponent of racial eugenics, his views were less severe in terms of creating and keeping distinct separations between races. Hall believed in giving "lower races" a chance to accept and adapt to "superior civilization". Hall even commended high ranking African Americans in society as being "exception to the Negro's diminished evolutionary inheritance". Hall viewed civilization in a similar fashion he viewed biological development. Humans must allow civilization to "run its natural evolution". Hall saw those who did not accept the superior civilization as being primitive "savages". Hall viewed these civilizations in a similar fashion as he viewed children, stating that "their faults and their virtues are those of childhood and youth". Hall believed that men and women should be separated into their own schools during puberty because it allowed them to be able to grow within their own gender. Women could be educated with motherhood in mind and the men could be educated in more hands-on projects, helping them to become leaders of their homes. Hall believed that schools with both sexes limited the way they could learn and softened the boys earlier than they should be. "It is a period of equilibrium, but with the onset of puberty the equilibrium is disturbed and new tendencies arise. Modifications in the reproductive organs take place and bring about secondary sexual characteristics. Extroversion gives way slowly to introversion, and more definitely social instincts begin to play an increasing role."

Hall was heavily influenced by Jean-Baptiste Lamarck and his theory of evolution. Hall found the idea of passing on memories from parent to offspring was a plausible mode of inheritance.

=== Anomalistic psychology ===
Hall was one of the founding members and a vice President of the American Society for Psychical Research. The early members of the society were skeptical of paranormal phenomena. Hall took a psychological approach to psychical phenomena. By 1890 he had resigned from the society. He became an outspoken critic of parapsychology.

Hall was an early psychologist in the field of anomalistic psychology. Hall and his assistant Amy Tanner from Clark University were notable debunkers of spiritualism and carried out psychological and physiological tests on mediums. Tanner published Studies in Spiritism (1910) with an introduction by Hall. The book documented the tests carried out by Hall and Tanner in the séance sittings held with the medium Leonora Piper. Hall and Tanner had proven by tests that the personalities of Piper were fictitious creations and not discarnate spirits.

== Guiding views ==
=== Social views ===
Hall was deeply wedded to the German concept of Volk, an anti-individualist and authoritarian romanticism in which the individual is dissolved into a transcendental collective. Hall believed that humans are by nature non-reasoning and instinct driven, requiring a charismatic leader to manipulate their herd instincts for the well-being of society. He predicted that the American emphasis on individual human right and dignity would lead to a fall that he analogized to the sinking of Atlantis.

Hall was one of the founders of the child-study movement in the 1880s. A national network of study groups called Hall Clubs existed to spread his teaching. He is popularly known today for supervising the 1896 study Of Peculiar and Exceptional Children, which described a series of only child eccentrics as permanent misfits. For decades, academics and advice columnists alike disseminated his conclusion that an only child could not be expected to go through life with the same capacity for adjustment that siblings possessed. "Being an only child is a disease in itself", he claimed.

Hall argued that child development recapitulates his highly racialized conception of the history of human evolutionary development. He characterized pre-adolescent children as savages and therefore rationalized that reasoning was a waste of time with children. He believed that children must simply be led to fear God, love country, and develop a strong body. As the child burns out the vestiges of evil in his nature, he needs a good dose of authoritarian discipline, including corporal punishment. He believed that adolescents are characterized by more altruistic natures than pre-adolescents and that high schools should indoctrinate students into selfless ideals of service, patriotism, body culture, military discipline, love of authority, awe of nature, and devotion to the state and the well-being of others. Hall consistently argued against intellectual attainment at all levels of public education. Open discussion and critical opinions were not to be tolerated. Students needed indoctrination to save them from the individualism that was so damaging to the progress of American culture.

Hall popularized the phrase "storm and stress" with reference to adolescence, taken from the German Sturm und Drang movement. His colleague William Burnham had published this phrase in relation to adolescence in an 1889 article titled 'Economy in Intellectual Work'. The concept's three key aspects are conflict with parents, mood disruptions, and risky behavior. As was later the case with the work of Lev Vygotsky and Jean Piaget, public interest in this phrase, as well as with Hall's role, faded. Recent research has led to some reconsideration of the phrase and its denotation. In its three aspects, recent evidence supports storm and stress, but only when modified to take into account individual differences and cultural variations. Currently, psychologists do not accept storm and stress as universal, but do acknowledge the possibility in brief passing. Not all adolescents experience storm and stress, but storm and stress is more likely during adolescence than at other ages.

Hall had no sympathy for the poor, the sick, or those with developmental differences or disabilities. A firm believer in selective breeding and forced sterilization, he believed that any respect or charity toward those he viewed as physically, emotionally, or intellectually weak or "defective" simply interfered with the movement of natural selection toward the development of a super-race.

Hall's major books were Adolescence: Its Psychology and Its Relations to Physiology, Anthropology, Sociology, Sex, Crime and Religion (1904) and Aspects of Child Life and Education (1921). In his book Adolescence, which was based on the results of the child-study movement, Hall described his system of psychology (which he called "genetic psychology") and the evolutionary benefits of development from the womb to adolescence. The book comprises six sections: biological and anthropological standpoint, medical standpoint, health and its tests, nobility of educated women, fecundity of educated women, and education. Hall hoped that this book would become a guide for teachers and social workers in the education system.

In 1904, Hall published "Adolescence: Its Psychology and Its Relation to Physiology, Anthropology, Sociology, Sex, Crime, Religion, and Education". In this 2-volume study, based on the idea that child development recapitulates human evolution, Hall took on a variety of issues and synthesized scholarship from a wide range of disciplines. After his retirement in 1920, Hall wrote a companion volume on aging. This important account has been labeled "prophetic" in its recognition of an emerging "crisis of aging" in the 20th century, in which longer lifespan, narrowing family roles, and expulsion from the workforce combined to dramatically isolate the elderly and restrict their active participation in public life. Hall railed against this process, arguing that the wisdom conferred by old age meant that the elderly had valuable and creative contributions to make to society. Yet, the stigma of aging meant that, instead, many were engaged in the foolish pursuit of youth, trying to avoid being excluded from full participation in their communities. In the conclusion of the book, Hall expressed a tangible sense of personal anger against this form of discrimination. His stirring call for a better understanding of the aging process anticipated the development of gerontology, and his critique of the marginalization of the elderly still resonates today.

Hall viewed masturbation as an immoral act and a blemish of the human race that interfered with moral and intellectual growth. Hall discussed masturbation in reference to men and did not discuss it in terms of women. It is not known whether he knew this act occurred in women or that Hall believed adolescent boys must go through what he described as "conversion". This conversion releases the boys from biological sins that were passed onto them by their ancestors. This passing on of sins through generations is guided by Lamarckian evolution. He claimed that conversion occurred as naturally as a "blossoming flower". Instead of masturbation, Hall viewed spontaneous emissions as a natural and acceptable alternative to forced ejaculation. Hall believed that he went through conversion during his freshman year at Williams College.

Hall also coined the technical words describing types of tickling: knismesis, or feather-like tickling; and gargalesis, for the harder, laughter inducing type.

Hall is best remembered for his contributions to psychology, for his support of applied psychology, and for his success in advising many doctoral students who have made great contributions to psychology. Hall also mentored the first African American to get a PhD in psychology, Francis Cecil Sumner in 1920.

=== Religious views ===
Hall is listed in the Cambridge Companion to Atheism as having been an atheist. Hall was a pioneer in the school of religious psychology. He was exposed to Christianity by his pious mother as a child. While he attended Williston Seminary School, he joined the college church and instructed adult bible classes. He is quoted as saying, "highest choice of free will is self surrender to the service of God", as well as "love fixed in the highest being, God". He moved on to attend Union Theological Seminary in New York in 1867. Interested in comparative religion, he took a position at the city missionary society and attended multiple types of religious services. After graduation, Hall served at a small church in Pennsylvania for a short while, before leaving to further his studies. Hall promoted religion as the reinstatement of the individual into their true place in the world, a return to health and wholeness. Hall would later teach religious psychology at Johns Hopkins and Clark School of Religious Psychology. He also founded a library department for religious psychology.

=== Views on eugenics ===
Hall expressed openly eugenic views in many of his writings. He was listed in numerous American eugenic organizations as its leader. The Eugenical News (1916–1922) celebrated the development of new American eugenic scholarly organization by highlighting that its roster included such as in the following announcement about "new active members of Eugenics Research Association ... C. C. Brigham, Psychological Laboratory, Princeton, N. J., G. Stanley Hall, Clark University, C. E. Seashore, State University of Iowa, Lewis M. Terman, Stanford University, Calif., John B. Watson, Johns Hopkins Hospital" (p. 53). Although Hall is credited with bringing notable psychoanalytic scholars to the U.S., including S. Freud and C. Jung, Hall expressed openly anti-psychoanalytic views in his writings that emphasized his eugenic commitments. For example, in the first issue of the Journal of Applied Psychology, of which Stanley G. Hall (1917) was an editor, his opening article proclaimed that the U.S. psychology had to "draw any lesson ... from the present war, in which the great Nordic race which embraces the dominant elements of all the belligerent nations is committing suicide" (p. 9) The most significant of these lessons, according to Hall, was for American psychology to fight against the "revisionary conceptions of Freud ... that it is ... normal for man at times to plunge back and down the evolutionary ladder" (p. 12).

Hall included openly anti-Semitic statements in his writings such as in his book On the Aspects of German Culture in which he discussed the supposed destruction of Western civilization by "rapacious Jews", though such statements were more often made to criticize than to condone anti-Semitism, as suggested in the quote: "they [the Jews] have been made the scapegoat for evils which they have not caused." Hall remarked, perhaps out of anti-Semitic feeling, that the psychoanalytic focus on "sex" in addition to this approach's "rapid growth ... found outside the circle of specialists [academic experimental psychologists]" made psychoanalysis and "the number of out-and-out disciples" to be a form of a "cult" (p. 412). Moreover, Hall stated that the "Freudian theory of therapy ... is mistaken" (p. 12), giving a warning example of how an individual's culturally unacceptable sexual desires and behaviors could be justified through psychoanalytic interpretations rather than "cured by the very modesty" based on cultural or religious norms (p. 13).

Hall held Victorian moral positions in regard to sexuality which regarded all divergent sexual experiences as amoral, including masturbation, same-sex sexuality, sex outside of marriage, and so forth. Hall claimed that psychoanalytic treatment would "destroy" this religious "morality" during the process of analysis (p. 13). In his book Jesus, the Christ, In the Light of Psychology Hall openly praised eugenics and discussed that the presence of supposedly evolutionary unfit people (i.e., the poor, racial minorities, immigrants) served the purpose of teaching the evolutionary fit people (i.e., Nordic wealthy Whites) virtues of caring for the lower classes. Other openly eugenic writings by Hall include his 1903 article entitled "The White Man's Burden versus Indigenous Development of the Lower Races" in The Journal of Education. A majority of American eugenic organizations listed Hall as the leader in this thought (e.g., American Eugenic Society, American Eugenic Research Organization). His students included many notable eugenicists, including H. H. Goddard, Robert Yerkes, Lewis Terman, and many others.

== Literary activities ==
An important contributor to educational literature, and a leading authority in that field, he founded and was editor of the American Journal of Psychology. In addition, he edited the Pedagogical Seminary (after 1892), the American Journal of Religious Psychology and Education (after 1904), and the Journal of Race Development (after 1910). Hall also wote an article for Harper's Magazine in 1901 in a piece titled The New Psychology, which detailed the psychological experiments he did during his time as a professor at Clark University. Hall was, from his student days to his death, interested in philosophy, psychology, education and religion in every one of their aspects which did not involve detailed experimentation, intricate quantitative treatment of results, or rigor and subtlety of analysis. There was, however, an order of emphasis, the years from '80 to '90 being devoted to problems of general psychology and education, those from 1890 to 1905 being especially devoted to the concrete details of human life, particularly the life of children and adolescents, and those from 1905 on being more devoted to wide-reaching problems of man's emotional, ethical and religious life.

== Legacy and honors ==
Hall contributed a large amount of work in understanding adolescent development, some of which still holds true today. Hall observed that males tend to have an increase in sensation seeking and aggression during adolescence. Hall also observed an increase in crime rates during the adolescent years. He noted that in terms of aggression there are two types; relational aggression and physical aggression. Relational aggression relates to gossiping, rumor spreading, and exclusions of others. Hall noted that relational aggression occurs more frequently in females while physical aggression occurs more often in males.

Much of the mark that Hall left behind was from his expansion of psychology as a field in the United States. He did a lot of work to bring psychology to the United States as a legitimate form of study and science. He began the first journal dedicated only to psychology in the United States of America, called the American Journal of Psychology. He was also the first president of the American Psychological Association. All of the work that Hall did in the field of psychology and for psychology in the United States of America allowed for all the other psychologists to follow in his foot steps and to become psychologists in the United States. Without the effort from Hall it could have taken many more years for psychology to become a field in the United States.

The World War II Liberty Ship SS Granville S. Hall was named in his honor.

== Personal life ==
Hall was married twice. His first wife was Cornelia Fisher. They were married September 1879 and had two children: Robert Granville Hall, born February 7, 1881; and Julia Fisher Hall, born May 30, 1882.

In 1890, Cornelia and Julia died of accidental asphyxiation. Robert was raised by his father from the age of four. He became a doctor.

Hall's second wife was Florence E Smith; they married in July 1899. Florence was diagnosed with "arteriosclerosis of the brain" and was institutionalized after years of eccentric behaviors.

Hall died on April 24, 1924, in Worcester, Massachusetts.

== Publications ==
- Adolescence : its psychology and its relations to physiology, anthropology, sociology, sex, crime, religion and education (1904)
- Aspects of German Culture (1881)
- Hints toward a Select and Descriptive Bibliography of Education (1886), with John M. Mansfield
- The Contents of Children's Minds on Entering School (1893)
- Supervised the study Of Peculiar and Exceptional Children by E. W. Bohannon, Fellow in Pedagogy at Clark University (1896)
- A Study of Dolls (1897)
- Confessions of a Psychologist (1900)
- Hall, G. S. (1903). The white man's burden versus indigenous development of the lower races. The Journal of Education, 58(4,1438), 83-83.
- Adolescence (Volume 1, Volume 2 1907)
- Spooks and Telepathy (1908)
- Youth: Its Education, Regimen, and Hygiene (1909)
- Introduction to Studies in Spiritism by Amy Tanner (1910)
- Educational Problems (Volume 1, Volume 2 1911)
- Hall, G. S. (1917b). Practical relations between psychology and the war. Journal of Applied Psychology, 1(1), 9-16. https://doi.org/10.1037/h0070238
- Jesus, the Christ, in the Light of Psychology (Volume 1, Volume 2 1917)
- Founders of Modern Psychology (1912)
- Morale, The Supreme Standard of Life and Conduct (1920)
- Aspects of Child Life and Education (1921)
- Senescence, The Last Half of Life (1922)

== See also ==
- Developmental psychology
- Recapitulation theory
- Theory of evolution
- Eugenics
