= Inappropriate affect =

Emotional expression that does not match the context or situation

Inappropriate affect is an emotional expression that does not align with the content of a person's speech or thoughts, or is unsuitable for the situation at hand. This is often observed in individuals with schizophrenia, where emotional responses, such as laughter, may occur in the absence of a relevant stimulus (see Paradoxical laughter).

Patients may exhibit excessive or incongruous expressions, such as giggling or loud laughter in response to neutral or somber thoughts, or display grief without apparent cause. This type of affect may suggest that the emotional expression holds personal, subjective meanings for the individual, which may only be understood within their specific context. It is important to differentiate inappropriate affect from culturally influenced emotional expressions that may be deemed appropriate within a specific subculture or ethnic group unfamiliar to the observer, as well as from defensive affects, such as nervous laughter used to manage tension or prevent emotional distress.

== See also ==
- Reduced affect display
