= Dirk De Ridder (neurosurgeon) =

Belgian neurosurgeon

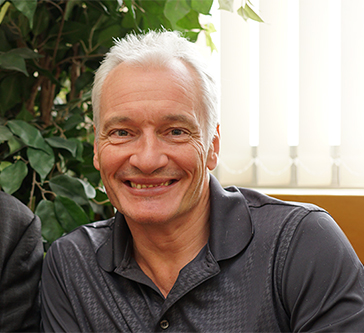
- Born: 6 August 1966 (age 60), Ghent, Belgium
- Residence: Dunedin, New Zealand
- Alma Mater: Ghent University, Belgium
- Known for: Experimental neurosurgery, brain implants, non-invasive neuromodulation

Scientific career
- Fields: Neurosurgery, Neuroscience
- Institution: University of Otago

Dirk De Ridder (born 6 August 1966) is a Belgian neurosurgeon. He is a professor of neurosurgery at the University of Otago in Dunedin, New Zealand. De Ridder spends half his time in New Zealand and half in Belgium, involved in setting up a dedicated neuromodulation clinic.

== Education ==
De Ridder was born and raised in Ghent, Belgium, in an academic family, with both his parents being university professors. As a child, he spent almost a year in Rwanda during primary school as well as a medical trainee later, and a year in the US in high school.

De Ridder obtained his MD at the Ghent University, Belgium in 1992 and PhD (a Darwinian neurosurgical approach to tinnitus) at the University of Antwerp in Belgium. He lived and worked for a year in South Africa, after which he worked for 12 years at the University Hospital Antwerpen in Antwerp, Belgium. He has lived in New Zealand since 2013 with his two sons.

== Research ==
De Ridder has published over 250 scientific articles, more than 30 scientific book chapters and several articles for a wider audience. His main research topic is the understanding and treatment of phantom perceptions such as pain and tinnitus, as well as addiction, using non-invasive neuromodulation (transcranial magnetic stimulation, transcranial direct-current stimulation, transcranial alternating current stimulation, transcranial random noise stimulation, tPNS, and neurofeedback) and especially invasive neuromodulation techniques such as brain implants. The focus of his research is to understand the common mechanisms of different diseases such as pain, tinnitus, Parkinson's, depression and slow wave epilepsy, a group of diseases known as thalamocortical dysrhythmias. His research also focuses on addiction, obsessive–compulsive disorder, impulsive and personality disorders, and an entity called reward deficiency syndromes. He has developed “burst” stimulation, novel stimulation design for brain and spine implants, which is commercialised by Abbott as burst-DR. He is currently working on other stimulation designs, such as noise stimulation and reconditioning stimulation. The philosophy of these stimulation designs is related to Antoni Gaudí's adage of mimicking nature, i.e. by mimicking natural firing and oscillation patterns in the nervous system.

== Contributions ==
De Ridder is recognized as one of the world's leading experts in tinnitus. He is a strong proponent of interdisciplinary and translational neuroscience. He translates basic neuroscience into novel brain surgery techniques with clinical applications via small pilot studies looking at feasibility and initial clinical results. His interdisciplinary approach is exemplified by the fact that he has published with more than 40 different research groups worldwide. For example, his translational work includes investigating:

- microvascular decompression for abducens spasm, as well as for hemilingual spasm;
- brain implants for tinnitus, on primary and secondary auditory cortex, frontal cortex, anterior cingulate cortex and amygdalohippocampal area;
- vagal nerve stimulation for tinnitus;
- somatosensory cortex implants for deafferentation pain;
- C2 implant for tinnitus, as well as for failed back surgery syndrome;
- out-of-body experience with PET scan in a person in whom the out-of-body experience could be elicited by activation of a brain implant;
- burst stimulation clinically on auditory cortex, spinal cord and peripheral nerve (C2 nerve); and
- dACC implants for alcohol addiction and obsessive–compulsive disorder.
