= Thalamocortical dysrhythmia =

Theoretical framework

Thalamocortical dysrhythmia (TCD) is a theoretical framework in which neuroscientists try to explain the positive and negative symptoms induced by neuropsychiatric disorders like Parkinson's disease, neurogenic pain, tinnitus, visual snow syndrome, schizophrenia, obsessive–compulsive disorder, depressive disorder and epilepsy. In TCD, normal thalamocortical resonance is disrupted by changes in the behaviour of neurons in the thalamus.
TCD can be treated with neurosurgical methods like the central lateral thalamotomy which, due to its invasiveness, is only used on patients that have proven resistant to conventional therapies.

== Background ==
At the base of the theory lies diminished excitatory or increased inhibitory input at the thalamic level. This leads to a switch of the thalamocortical neurons from tonic to burst firing and subsequently entrains thalamic and cortical areas with pathological oscillations at around 5 Hz.

== Evidence ==
Evidence for TCD comes from magnetoencephalography (MEG), and electroencephalography (EEG) recordings on the scalp as well as local field potential (LFP) recordings in the patients' thalamus during surgery. Analysing the power spectra reveals increased coherence as well as increased bicoherence in the power spectra in the theta band compared to healthy controls. This indicates a close coupling of cortex and thalamus in the generation of the pathological theta rhythmicity.

The thalamic loss of input or gated activity allows the frequency of the thalamo-cortical column to slow into the theta or delta band, and this defeats the lateral inhibition, so faster Gamma band activity appears surrounding the area of slower alpha seen in the theta band, with the theta associated with negative symptoms and the Gamma for positive symptoms. This is documented in Tinnitus (phantom sound) and phantom pain, as well as Parkinsonism and recently even in depression (see current work by Dirk DeRidder, MD, PhD). The thalamocoherence was identified by machine learning, with significant differentiation of each of these clinical entities from normal by the presence of the dysrhythmia, and with the specific disorder differentiated by the spatial/topographic networks involved. It was also proposed that psychotic disorders present in Parkinson disease‐dementia with Lewy bodies depend on thalamic abnormal rhythms.

Recent neuro-otological research and case studies have explored the role of auditory entrainment technologies, such as binaural beats (e.g., Hemi-Sync), in modulating thalamocortical rhythms. Because these protocols rely on the Frequency Following Response (FFR) to drive the brain into specific wave states (typically Alpha or Theta), prolonged exposure in sensitive or developing populations may theoretically induce a persistent state of dysrhythmia. This occurs when the external driver causes an Alpha-to-Theta frequency shift in the thalamic relay, resulting in the 'edge effect' and high-frequency gamma-band activation associated with chronic neurogenic tinnitus.

== Therapy ==
While it is not clear how this happens in detail, surgical intervention by means of lesioning small parts of the central lateral thalamic areas has proven successful as a therapy for Parkinson's Disease as well as neurogenic pain.Neurofeedback, where the brain is trained to emphasise and de-emphasise brain wave frequencies, amplitudes and coherence can be an effective noninvasive therapy.
