= Aphonogelia =

Inability to laugh audibly

Aphonogelia is a rare neuropsychological condition with which a person cannot laugh audibly. The condition can be caused by traumatic brain injury, specifically to the right temporal lobe.With only 3 previously known cases, there are currently no known treatment methods for this condition, although the usage of nitrous oxide has been suggested as an experimental treatment.
