= Tickling =

Action of making one laugh through physical touch

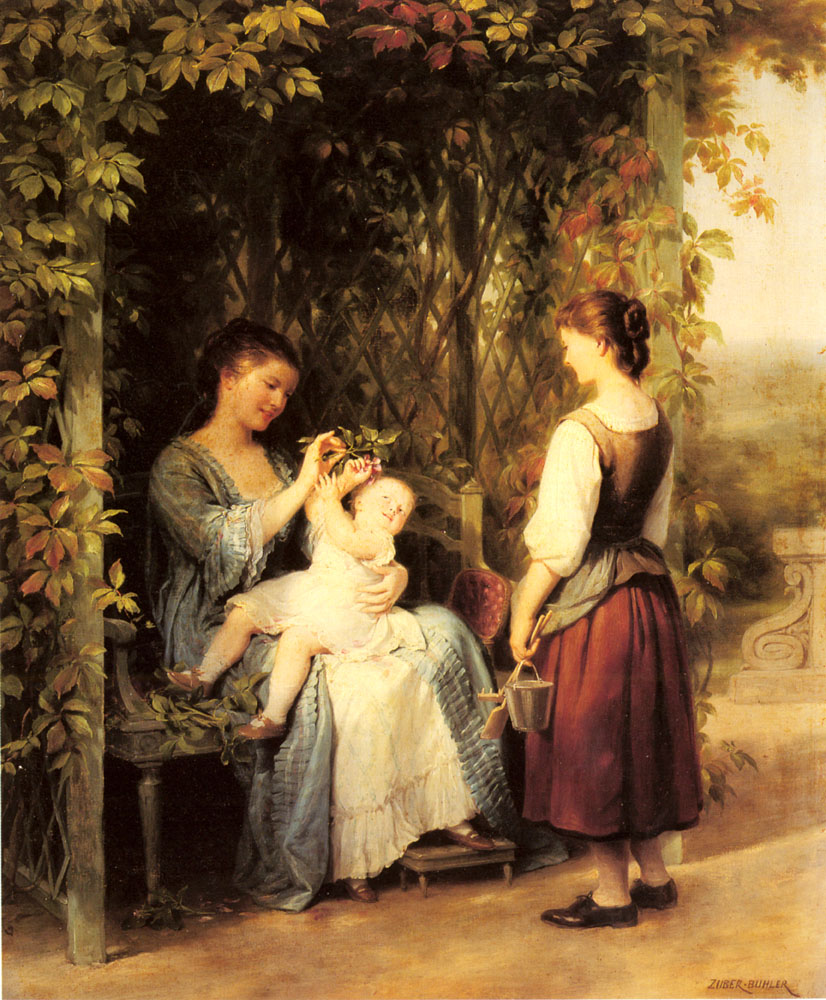
Tickling The Baby by Fritz Zuber-Buhler, 19th century painting

Tickling is the act of touching a part of a person's body in a way that causes involuntary twitching movements or laughter. The word "tickle" evolved from the Middle English tikelen, perhaps frequentative of ticken, to touch lightly.

In 1897, psychologists G. Stanley Hall and Arthur Allin described a "tickle" as two different types of phenomena. One type is caused by very light movement across the skin. This type of tickle, called a knismesis, generally does not produce laughter and is sometimes accompanied by an itching sensation.

== Physiology ==
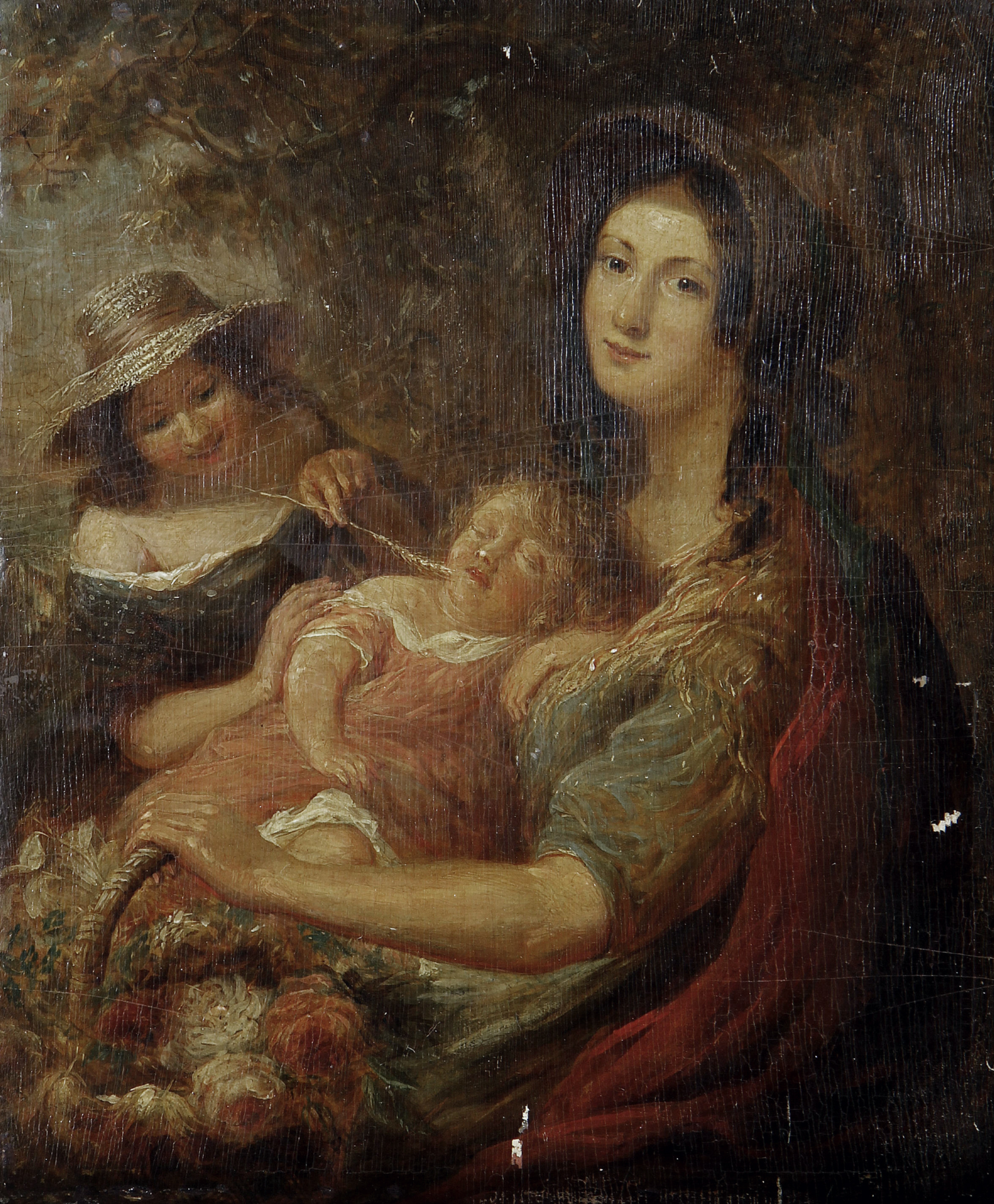
James John Hill

Tickling results from a mild stimulation moving across the skin, and is associated with behaviors such as smiling, laughter, twitching, withdrawal and goose bumps.

The tickle can be divided into two separate categories of sensation, knismesis and gargalesis. Knismesis, also known as a "moving itch", is a mildly annoying sensation caused by a light movement on the skin, such as from a crawling insect. This may explain why it has evolved in many animals. For example, a dog exhibiting the scratch reflex is an example of knismesis. When stimulated in the saddle region, most dogs will exhibit a reflexive rhythmic twitching of their hind legs. This reflex can be brought on by actions such as scratching, brushing, stroking, or even tapping the sensitive area. Horses also exhibit a response to knismesis, as they can be observed twitching the panniculus carnosus muscle in response to insects landing on their sides. Gargalesis reactions refer to a laughter-provoking feeling caused by a harsher, deeper pressure, stroked across the skin in various regions of the body. These reactions are thought to be limited to humans and other primates, although some research has indicated that rats can also be tickled in this way. A German study also indicates that the gargalesis type of tickle triggers a defense mechanism for humans in the hypothalamus conveying submissiveness or fleeing from danger.

It appears that the tickle sensation involves signals from nerve fibres associated with both pain and touch. In 1939, Yngve Zotterman of the Karolinska Institute studied the knismesis type of tickle in cats, by measuring the action potentials generated in the nerve fibres while lightly stroking the skin with a piece of cotton wool. Zotterman found that the "tickling" sensation depended, in part, on the nerves that generate pain. Further studies have discovered that when the pain nerves are severed by surgeons, in an effort to reduce intractable pain, the tickle response is also diminished. However, in some patients that have lost pain sensation due to spinal cord injury, some aspects of the tickle response do remain. Tickle may also depend on nerve fibres associated with the sense of touch. When circulation is severed in a limb, the response to touch and tickle are lost prior to the loss of pain sensation.

Areas of the skin that are the most sensitive to touch are not necessarily the most ticklish. While the palm of the hand is far more sensitive to touch, most people find that the soles of their feet are the most ticklish. Other commonly ticklish areas, in decreasing order of effect, include the armpits, the neck, under the chin and the ribs.

Some evidence suggests that laughing associated with tickling is a nervous reaction that can be triggered; indeed, very ticklish people often start laughing before actually being tickled.

== Social aspects ==
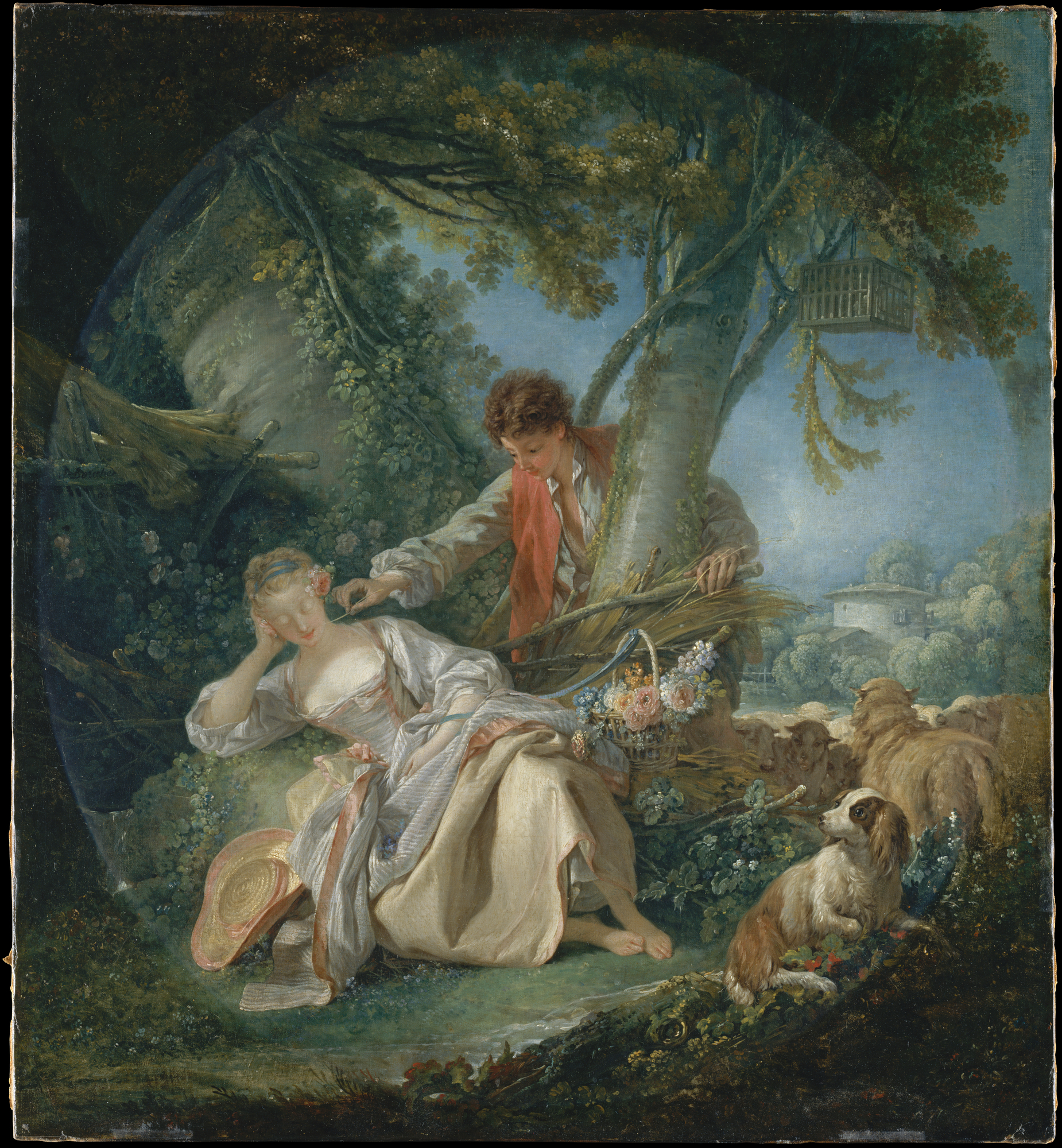
François Boucher – Le sommeil interrompu

Charles Darwin theorized on the link between tickling and social relations, arguing that tickling provokes laughter through the anticipation of pleasure. If a stranger tickles a child without any preliminaries, catching the child by surprise, the likely result will be not laughter but withdrawal and displeasure. Darwin also noticed that for tickling to be effective, the ticklee must not know the precise point of stimulation in advance, and reasoned that this is why most people cannot effectively tickle themselves.

Darwin explained why we laugh when we are tickled by saying, "The imagination is sometimes said to be tickled by a ludicrous idea; and this so-called tickling of the mind is curiously analogous with that of the body. Laughter from being tickled [is manifestly a] reflex action; and likewise this is shown by the minute unstriped muscles, which serve to erect the separate hairs on the body".

Tickling is defined by many child psychologists as an integral bonding activity between parents and children. In the parent–child concept, the pleasure associated with being tickled by a parent establishes a trust-bond at an early age, so that parents will be able to touch the child even in an unpleasant way (such when there is need to treat a painful injury or prevent them from harm or danger). This tickling relationship continues throughout childhood and often into the early to mid teen years.

Another tickling social relationship is that which forms between siblings of relatively the same age. Many case studies have indicated that siblings often use tickling as an alternative to outright violence when attempting to either punish or intimidate one another. The sibling tickling relationship can occasionally develop into an anti-social situation, or tickle torture, where one sibling will tickle the other without mercy. The motivation behind tickle torture is often to portray the sense of domination the tickler has over the victim.

As with parents and siblings, tickling serves as a bonding mechanism between friends, and is classified by psychologists as part of the fifth and highest grade of social play which involves special intimacy or "cognitive interaction". This suggests that tickling works best when all the parties involved feel comfortable with the situation and one another. It can also serve as an outlet for sexual energy during adolescence, and a number of people have stated in a study that their private areas were ticklish.

While many people assume that other people enjoy tickling, a recent survey of 84 college students indicated that only 32% of respondents enjoy being tickled, with 32% giving neutral responses and 36% stating that they do not enjoy being tickled. The study also found a very high level of embarrassment and anxiety associated with tickling. However, in the same study the authors found that the facial indicators of happiness and amusement do not correlate, with some people who indicated that they do not enjoy being tickled actually smiling more often during tickling than those who indicated that they do enjoy being tickled, which suggests that the facial indicators are not produced in response to the same emotions as under typical circumstances. It has also been suggested that people may enjoy tickling because it elicits laughter as well as the feeling of being tickled. Social psychologists find that mimicking expressions generally cause people to some degree experience that emotion.

Excessive tickling has been described as a primary sexual obsession and, under these circumstances, is sometimes considered a form of paraphilia. Tickling can also be a form of sexual harassment.

== Purpose ==
Some of history's greatest thinkers have pondered the mysteries of the tickle response, including Plato, Francis Bacon, Galileo Galilei and Charles Darwin. In The Assayer, Galileo philosophically examines tickling in the context of how we perceive reality:

When touched upon the soles of the feet, for example, it feels in addition to the common sensation of touch a sensation on which we have imposed a special name, "tickling." This sensation belongs to us and not to the hand... A piece of paper or a feather drawn lightly over any part of our bodies performs intrinsically the same operations of moving and touching, but by touching the eye, the nose, or the upper lip it excites in us an almost intolerable titillation, even though elsewhere it is scarcely felt. This titillation belongs entirely to us and not to the feather; if the live and sensitive body were removed it would remain no more than a mere word.

Francis Bacon and Charles Darwin believed that humorous laughter requires a "light" frame of mind. But they differed on ticklish laughter: Darwin thought that the same light state of mind was required, whereas Bacon disagreed. When tickled, noted Bacon, "men even in a grieved state of mind, yet cannot sometimes forbear laughing."

One hypothesis, as mentioned above, is that tickling serves as a pleasant bonding experience between parent and child. However, this hypothesis does not adequately explain why many children and adults find tickling to be an unpleasant experience. Another view maintained is that tickling develops as a prenatal response and that the development of sensitive areas on the fetus helps to orient the fetus into favourable positions while in the womb.

It is unknown why certain people find areas of the body to be more ticklish than others; additionally, studies have shown that there is no significant difference in ticklishness among the genders. In 1924, J. C. Gregory proposed that the most ticklish places on the body were also those areas that were the most vulnerable during hand-to-hand combat. He posited that ticklishness might confer an evolutionary advantage by enticing the individual to protect these areas. Consistent with this idea, University of Iowa psychiatrist Donald W. Black observed that most ticklish spots are found in the same places as the protective reflexes.

A third, hybrid hypothesis, has suggested that tickling encourages the development of combat skills. Most tickling is done by parents, siblings and friends and is often a type of rough-and-tumble play, during which time children often develop defensive and combat moves. Although people generally make movements to get away from, and report disliking, being tickled, laughter encourages the tickler to continue. If the facial expressions induced by tickle were less pleasant the tickler would be less likely to continue, thus diminishing the frequency of these combat lessons.

To understand how much of the tickle response is dependent on the interpersonal relationship of the parties involved, Christenfeld and Harris presented subjects with a "mechanical tickle machine". They found that the subjects laughed just as much when they believed they were being tickled by a machine as when they thought they were being tickled by a person. Harris goes on to suggest that the tickle response is reflex, similar to the startle reflex, that is contingent upon the element of surprise.

== Self-tickling ==
The question as to why a person could not tickle themselves was raised by the Greek philosopher Aristotle in Problems. His theory was that laughter arises from being deranged or deceived, to be surprised (such as in tickling) is inherently to be deceived, and one cannot surprise, deceive, and thereby tickle oneself.

Knismesis may represent a vestige of the primitive grooming response, in effect; knismesis serves as a "non-self detector" and protects the subject against foreign objects. Perhaps due to the importance of knismesis in protection, this type of light touch is not dependent on the element of surprise and it is possible for one to induce self-knismesis, by light touching.

Gargalesis, on the other hand, produces an odd phenomenon: when a person touches "ticklish" parts on their own body no tickling sensation is experienced. It is thought that the tickling requires a certain amount of surprise, and because tickling oneself produces no unexpected motion on the skin, the response is not activated. In 1998, Blakemore and colleagues analyzed the "self-tickle" response by using MRI technology to investigate how the brain distinguishes between sensations the person makes for themself, and sensations others create for. When subjects used a joystick to control a "tickling robot", they could not make themselves laugh. This suggests that when a person tries to tickle themselves, the cerebellum sends to the somatosensory cortex precise information on the position of the tickling target and therefore what sensation to expect. Apparently an unknown cortical mechanism then decreases or inhibits the tickling sensation.

While the reasons for the inhibition of the tickling sensation during self-tickling remain unknown, research shows that the human brain is trained to know what sensation to expect when the body moves or performs an action. Another reason may be the lack of awareness of many sensations arising from self-movement, such as not paying attention to one's own vocal cords. When one tries to tickle oneself by grabbing one's sides, the brain foresees this contact between body and hand and prepares itself for it. This removes the feeling of unease and panic, causing the body to not react to tickling in the same way it would if someone else supplied the stimulus.

However, some people with schizophrenia have the ability to tickle themselves. Non-pathological individuals high in schizotypical traits also have a greater self-tickling ability than people low in schizotypical traits. This is suggested to possibly correlate with a less pronounced ability of these people to track and attribute the results of their own actions.

== Tickle fight ==
A tickle fight is a playful leisure activity in which two people, or sometimes more, tickle each other to the point where one of the participants gives up. It can occur as a sudden outburst without consensus about it, or as a carefully designed challenge with clear ground rules. Tickle fighting is similar to pillow fighting, in the sense that they are both silly and playful activities, usually not taken too seriously. Tickle fighting is especially enjoyed by young children. Tickle fight should not be confused with tickle torture, which is an abusive and serious torturing method.

A participant in a tickle fight can be called a tickler.

== As physical abuse ==
Although some consensual tickling can be a positive, playful experience, non-consensual tickling can be frightening, uncomfortable, and painful for the recipient. Heinz Heger, a man imprisoned in the Flossenbürg concentration camp during World War II, witnessed Nazi prison guards perform tickle torture on a fellow inmate. He describes this incident in his book The Men with the Pink Triangle: "The first game that the SS sergeant and his men played was to tickle their victim with goose feathers, on the soles of his feet, between his legs, in the armpits, and on other parts of his naked body. At first the prisoner forced himself to keep silent, while his eyes twitched in fear and torment from one SS man to the other. Then he could not restrain himself and finally he broke out in a high-pitched laughter that very soon turned into a cry of pain, while the tears ran down his face, and his body twisted against his chains. After this tickling torture, they let the lad hang there for a little, while a flood of tears ran down his cheeks and he cried and sobbed uncontrollably."

An article in the British Medical Journal describes a European method of tickle torture in which a goat was compelled to lick the victim's feet after they had been dipped in salt water. Once the goat had licked the salt off, the victim's feet would be dipped in the salt water again and the process would repeat itself. In ancient Japan, authority figures could administer punishments to those convicted of crimes that were beyond the criminal code. This was called shikei, which translates as 'private punishment'. One such torture was kusuguri-zeme: "merciless tickling."

In Vernon Wiehe's book Sibling Abuse, he published his research findings regarding 150 adults who were abused by their siblings during childhood. Several reported tickling as a type of physical abuse they experienced, and based on these reports it was revealed that abusive tickling is capable of provoking extreme physiological reactions in the victim, such as vomiting, incontinence (losing control of bladder), and loss of consciousness due to inability to breathe.

== See also ==
- Feeling
- Tickling fetishism
