= Laughter-induced syncope =

Syncope

Laughter-induced syncope is an unusual but recognized form of situational syncope (fainting) likely to have a similar pathophysiological origin to tussive syncope. One reported case occurred while a patient was watching the television show Seinfeld, and was given the name Seinfeld syncope.

There are few case reports of this syndrome in the literature. Patients, as in this case, might present initially to the emergency department, and laughter should be considered among the numerous differentials for syncope.

Laughter-induced syncope should not be confused with cataplexy, a sudden loss of muscle tone triggered by strong emotions, particularly laughter. Unlike syncope, there is no loss of consciousness in cataplexy, which affects 65-75% of patients with narcolepsy.

To date there have been few cases of laughter-induced syncope documented in medical literature.
