= John Morreall =

John Morreall (born February 1, 1947, in Rochester, New York) is a Doctor of Philosophy and Emeritus Professor of Religious Studies at the College of William and Mary in Williamsburg, Virginia. He has also taught at Northwestern University, Santa Clara University, Pennsylvania State University, University of South Florida and the Rochester Institute of Technology.

Morreall is a founder of the International Society for Humor Studies (ISHS) and was elected its president for 2004–2005. He is on the board of Humor: International Journal of Humor Research, and was its Review Editor from 1988 to 1999.

== Books and publications ==
- Taking Laughter Seriously (SUNY Press, 1983)
- The Philosophy of Laughter and Humor (SUNY Press, 1987)
- Humor Works (Human Resource Development Press, 1997)
- Comedy, Tragedy, and Religion (SUNY Press, 1999).
- Comic Relief: A Comprehensive Philosophy of Humor (Wiley-Blackwell, 2009).
- The Religion Toolkit: A Complete Guide to Religious Studies with Tamara Sonn (Wiley-Blackwell, 2012).
- 50 Great Myths about Religions with Tamara Sonn (Wiley-Blackwell, 2014).
- Questions for Christians: The Surprising Truths behind Basic Beliefs (Rowman & Littlefield, 2014).
- Laughing All the Way (Motivational Press, 2016).

Morreall has also published over 60 articles, chapters, and reviews on humor, as well as over 40 articles and chapters on other topics in philosophy, religion, and linguistics.

Morreall has done over 500 presentations on humor for business, educational, and medical groups in the U.S., Canada, Europe, Africa, China, and Japan, under the name Humorworks.
