= Laughter =

Expression of amusement

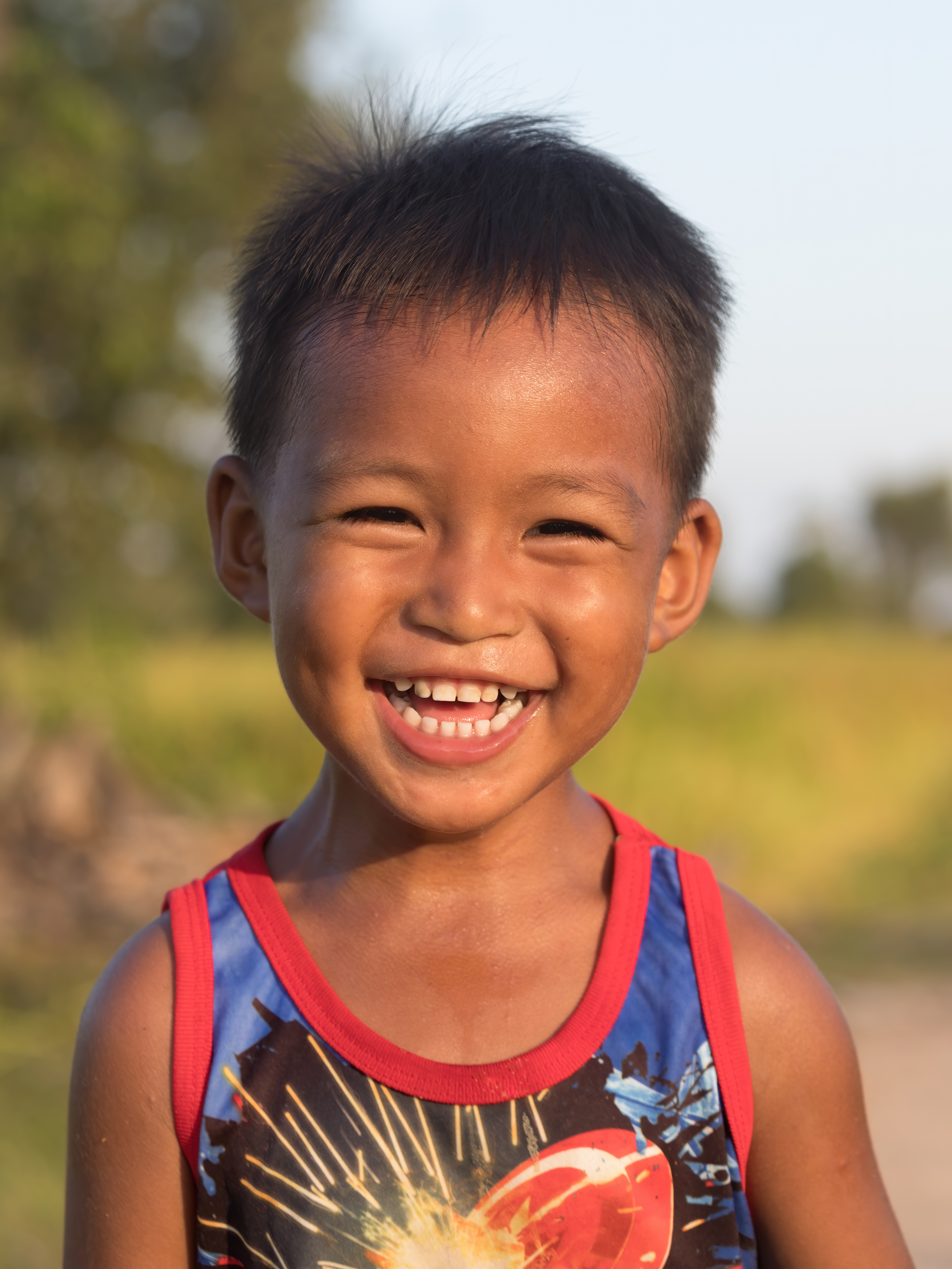
A child in Laos laughing

Audio of a woman laughing

Laughter is a typically pleasant physical reaction and emotion consisting usually of rhythmical, usually audible contractions of the diaphragm and other parts of the respiratory system. It is a response to certain external or internal stimuli. Laughter can rise from such stimuli as being tickled, or from humorous stories, imagery, videos or thoughts. Most commonly, it is considered an auditory expression of a number of positive emotional states, such as joy, mirth, happiness or relief. On some occasions, however, it may be caused by contrary emotional states such as embarrassment, surprise, or confusion such as nervous laughter or courtesy laugh. Age, gender, education, language and culture are all indicators as to whether a person will experience laughter in a given situation. Other than humans, some other species of primate (chimpanzees, gorillas and orangutans) express laughter-like vocalizations in response to physical contact such as wrestling, play chasing or tickling.

Laughter is a part of human behavior regulated by the brain, helping humans clarify their intentions in social interaction and providing an emotional context to conversations. Laughter is used as a signal for being part of a group—it signals acceptance and positive interactions with others. Laughter is sometimes seen as contagious and the laughter of one person can itself provoke laughter from others as a positive feedback.

The study of humor and laughter, and its psychological and physiological effects on the human body, is called gelotology.

== Nature ==
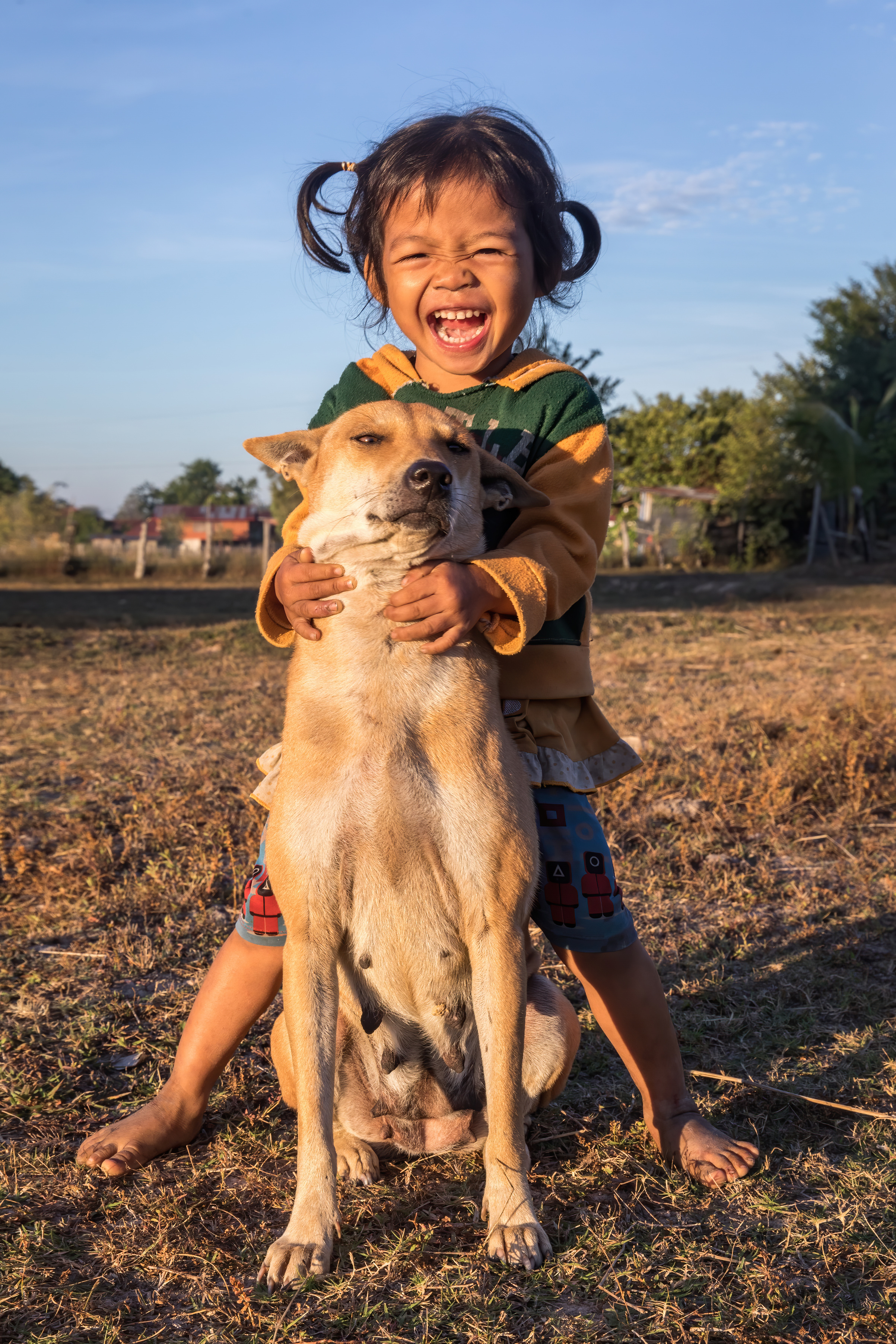
A young girl from Laos laughing while hugging her dog

Laughter might be thought of as an audible expression or appearance of excitement, an inward feeling of joy and happiness. It may ensue from jokes, tickling, and other stimuli completely unrelated to psychological state, such as nitrous oxide. One group of researchers speculated that noises from infants as early as 16 days old may be vocal laughing sounds or laughter. However, the weight of the evidence supports the appearance of such sounds at 15 weeks to four months of age.

Laughter researcher Robert Provine said: "Laughter is a mechanism everyone has; laughter is part of universal human vocabulary. There are thousands of languages, hundreds of thousands of dialects, but everyone speaks laughter in pretty much the same way." Babies have the ability to laugh before they ever speak. Children who are born blind and deaf still retain the ability to laugh.

Provine argues that "Laughter is primitive, an unconscious vocalization." Provine argues that it probably is genetic. In a study of the "Giggle Twins", two happy twins who were separated at birth and only reunited 43 years later, Provine reports that "until they met each other, neither of these exceptionally happy ladies had known anyone who laughed as much as they did." They reported this even though they had been brought together by their adoptive parents, who they indicated were "undemonstrative and dour". He indicates that the twins "inherited some aspects of their laugh sound and pattern, readiness to laugh, and maybe even taste in humor".

Scientists have noted the similarity in forms of laughter induced by tickling among various primates, which suggests that laughter derives from a common origin among primate species.

The spotted hyena, another species of animal, was also known as the laughing hyena because of the way it sounds when it communicates.

A very rare neurological condition has been observed whereby the sufferer is unable to laugh out loud, a condition known as aphonogelia.

== Brain ==
Neurophysiology indicates that laughter is linked with the activation of the ventromedial prefrontal cortex, that produces endorphins. Scientists have shown that parts of the limbic system are involved in laughter. This system is involved in emotions and helps us with functions necessary for humans' survival. The structures in the limbic system that are involved in laughter are the hippocampus and the amygdala.

The December 7, 1984, Journal of the American Medical Association describes the neurological causes of laughter as follows:

Although there is no known 'laugh center' in the brain, its neural mechanism has been the subject of much, albeit inconclusive, speculation. It is evident that its expression depends on neural paths arising in close association with the telencephalic and diencephalic centers concerned with respiration. Wilson considered the mechanism to be in the region of the mesial thalamus, hypothalamus, and subthalamus. Kelly and co-workers, in turn, postulated that the tegmentum near the periaqueductal grey contains the integrating mechanism for emotional expression. Thus, supranuclear pathways, including those from the limbic system that Papez hypothesised to mediate emotional expressions such as laughter, probably come into synaptic relation in the reticular core of the brain stem. So while purely emotional responses such as laughter are mediated by subcortical structures, especially the hypothalamus, and are stereotyped, the cerebral cortex can modulate or suppress them.

A 2003 review distinguishes involuntary laughter from "faked" laughter, supporting the idea that they depend on different parts of the brain. The review describes the first system as involuntary and driven by emotion, and it's the one that causes a person to laugh when something is funny or causes them to laugh. This system includes the amygdala, parts of the thalamus and hypothalamus, and the dorsal/back, part of the brainstem. This all belongs to the first separate part of the system. The second system is voluntary and it's used when someone laughs on purpose. It starts in the front of the brain, in the premotor and frontal opercular areas, and this sends signals through the motor cortex to the ventral/front, part of the brainstem. According to the review, there is a "laugh coordinating centre" that connects the two separate systems together to carry out the laughing response. The review also points out that it's hard to study what happens in the brain when people find something funny and begin to laugh because researchers say they don't know exactly what humor is. The review explains that this knowledge came from many kinds of research. Including studies of patients with brain problems, studies using brain stimulation, and also brain imaging of healthy people and comparing. The review also looks at the brain areas that are involved when a person understands that something is funny. Depending on the kind of humor, these areas may include the frontal cortex, the medial ventral prefrontal cortex, and the back part of the temporal lobe on both sides of the brain. The cerebellum could also be involved.

Some drugs are well known for their laughter-facilitating properties (e. g. ethanol and cannabis), while the others, like salvinorin A (the active ingredient of Salvia divinorum), can even induce bursts of uncontrollable laughter.

A research article was published December 1, 2000, on the psycho-evolution of laughter (Panksepp 2000).

== Health ==
A link between laughter and healthy function of blood vessels was first reported in 2005 by researchers at the University of Maryland Medical Center with the fact that laughter causes the dilatation of the inner lining of blood vessels, the endothelium, and increases blood flow. Drs. Michael Miller (University of Maryland) and William Fry (Stanford) theorize that beta-endorphin-like compounds released by the hypothalamus activate receptors on the endothelial surface to release nitric oxide, thereby resulting in dilation of vessels. Other cardioprotective properties of nitric oxide include reduction of inflammation and decreased platelet aggregation.

Laughter has various proven beneficial biochemical effects. It has been shown to lead to reductions in stress hormones such as cortisol and epinephrine. When laughing, the brain releases endorphins that can relieve some physical pain. Laughter also boosts the number of antibody-producing cells and enhances the effectiveness of T-cells, leading to a stronger immune system. A 2000 study found that people with heart disease were 40 percent less likely to laugh and be able to recognize humor in a variety of situations, compared to people of the same age without heart disease.

Anecdotally, journalist and author Norman Cousins developed in 1964 a treatment program for his ankylosing spondylitis and collagen disease consisting of large doses of Vitamin C alongside laughter induced by comic films, including those of the Marx Brothers. "I made the joyous discovery that ten minutes of genuine belly laughter had an anesthetic effect and would give me at least two hours of pain-free sleep," he reported. "When the pain-killing effect of the laughter wore off, we would switch on the motion picture projector again and not infrequently, it would lead to another pain-free interval."

== Communication ==
Laughter is often social and functional. A number of studies using methods of conversation analysis and discourse analysis have documented the systematic workings of laughter, for example in casual conversations, interviews, meetings, and therapy sessions. By closely examining recorded interactions, researchers have created detailed transcripts that indicate not only the presence of laughter but also features of its production and placement.

An example of overlapped laughter in American English conversation

These studies challenge several widely held assumptions about the nature of laughter. Contrary to notions that it is spontaneous and involuntary, research documents that laughter is sequentially organized and precisely placed relative to surrounding talk, and, in the common case of overlapped laughter, relative to the laughter bouts of the conversation partner. Far more than merely a response to humor, laughter often works to manage delicate and serious moments. More than simply an external behavior "caused" by an inner state, laughter is highly communicative and helps accomplish actions and regulate relationships.

== Causes ==
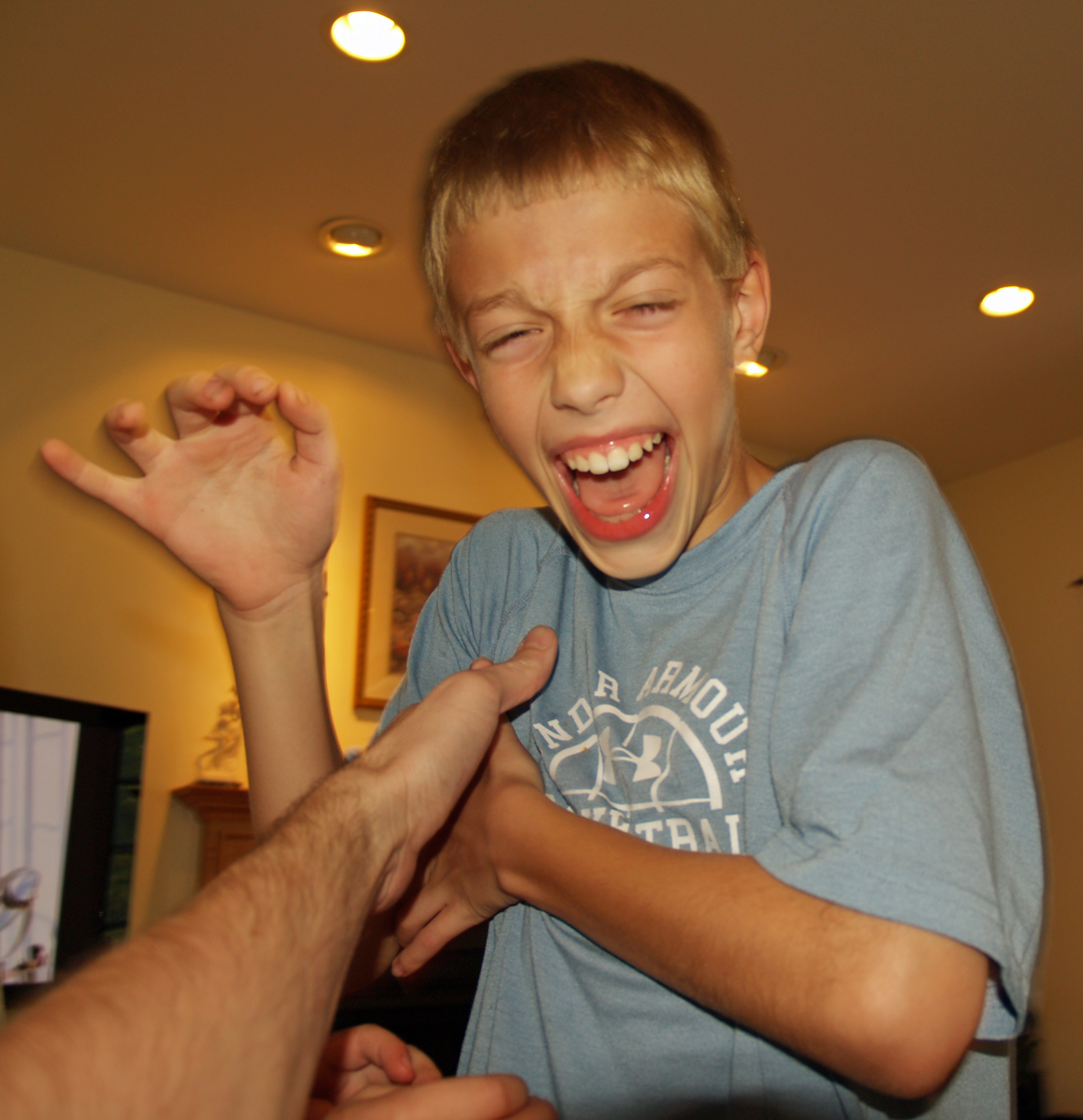
Laughter is a common response to tickling.

Common causes for laughter are sensations of joy and humor; however, other situations may cause laughter as well.

A general theory that explains laughter is called the relief theory. Sigmund Freud summarized it in his theory that laughter releases tension and "psychic energy". This theory is one of the justifications of the beliefs that laughter is beneficial for one's health. This theory explains why laughter can be used as a coping mechanism when one is upset, angry or sad.

Philosopher John Morreall theorizes that human laughter may have its biological origins as a kind of shared expression of relief at the passing of danger. Friedrich Nietzsche, by contrast, suggested laughter to be a reaction to the sense of existential loneliness and mortality that only humans feel.

For example: a joke creates an inconsistency and the audience automatically tries to understand what the inconsistency means; if they are successful in solving this 'cognitive riddle' and they realize that the surprise was not dangerous, they laugh with relief. Otherwise, if the inconsistency is not resolved, there is no laugh, as Mack Sennett pointed out: "when the audience is confused, it doesn't laugh." This is one of the basic laws of a comedian, referred to as "exactness". Sometimes the inconsistency may be resolved and there may still be no laugh. Because laughter is a social mechanism, an audience may not feel as if they are in danger, and the laugh may not occur. In addition, the extent of the inconsistency (and aspects of its timing and rhythm) has to do with the amount of danger the audience feels, and how hard or long they laugh.

Laughter can also be brought on by tickling. Although most people find it unpleasant, being tickled often causes heavy laughter, thought to be an (often uncontrollable) reflex of the body.

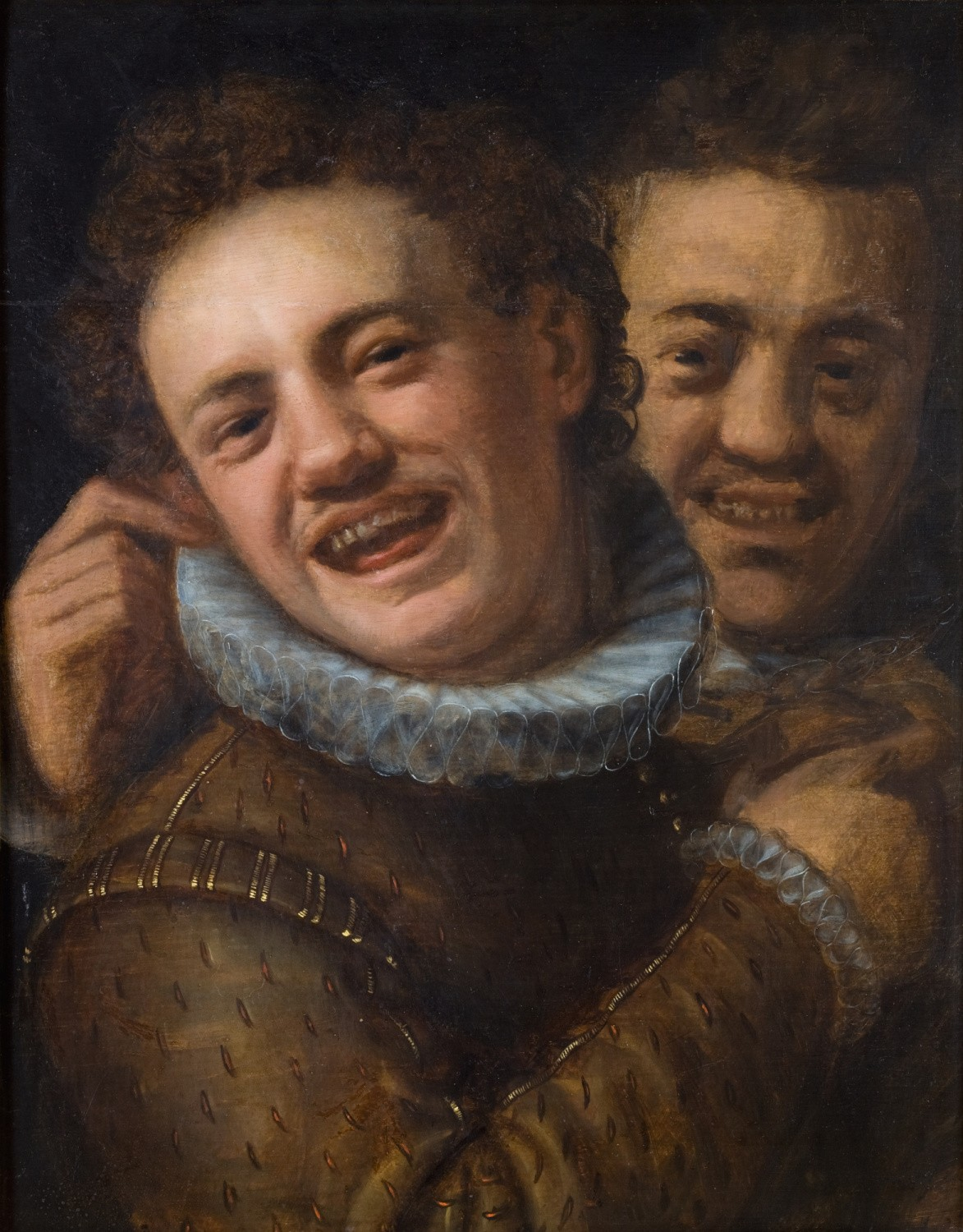
Two laughing men by Hans von Aachen, circa 1574

== Structure and anatomy ==
The forms of laughter are highly varied. Many laughs consist of sequences of bursts, such as ha-ha-ha or ho-ho-ho-ho. In extended laughter, several such bouts (burst sequences) may occur, often interleaved with loud inhalations. Recent research has detailed aspects of the phonetic structure of laughter, especially as it occurs in interaction. While produced using the same vocal tract anatomy as speech, the phonetics and prosody of laughter differs from that of speech in many ways, such as usually having higher pitch. Laughed speech is also common, as in the example at right.

An illustration of laughing while speaking

Not every imaginable laugh actually occurs. It is unnatural, and one is physically unable, to have a laugh structure of "ha-ho-ha-ho". The usual variations of a laugh most often occur in the first or final note in a sequence- therefore, "ho-ha-ha" or "ha-ha-ho" laughs are possible. Normal note durations with unusually long or short "inter-note intervals" do not happen due to the result of the limitations of our vocal cords. This basic structure allows one to recognize a laugh despite individual variants.

It has also been determined that eyes moisten during laughter as a reflex from the tear glands.

== Negative aspects ==
Laughter is not always a pleasant experience and is associated with several negative phenomena. Excessive laughter can lead to cataplexy, and unpleasant laughter spells, excessive elation, and fits of laughter can all be considered negative aspects of laughter. Unpleasant laughter spells, or "sham mirth", usually occur in people who have a neurological condition, including patients with pseudobulbar palsy, multiple sclerosis and Parkinson's disease. These patients appear to be laughing out of amusement but report that they are feeling undesirable sensations "at the time of the punch line".

Excessive elation is a common symptom associated with bipolar disorder psychoses and mania/hypomania. Those with schizophrenic psychoses seem to experience the opposite—they do not understand humor or get any joy out of it. A fit describes an abnormal time when one cannot control the laughter or one's body, sometimes leading to seizures or a brief period of unconsciousness. Some believe that fits of laughter represent a form of epilepsy.

== Therapy ==
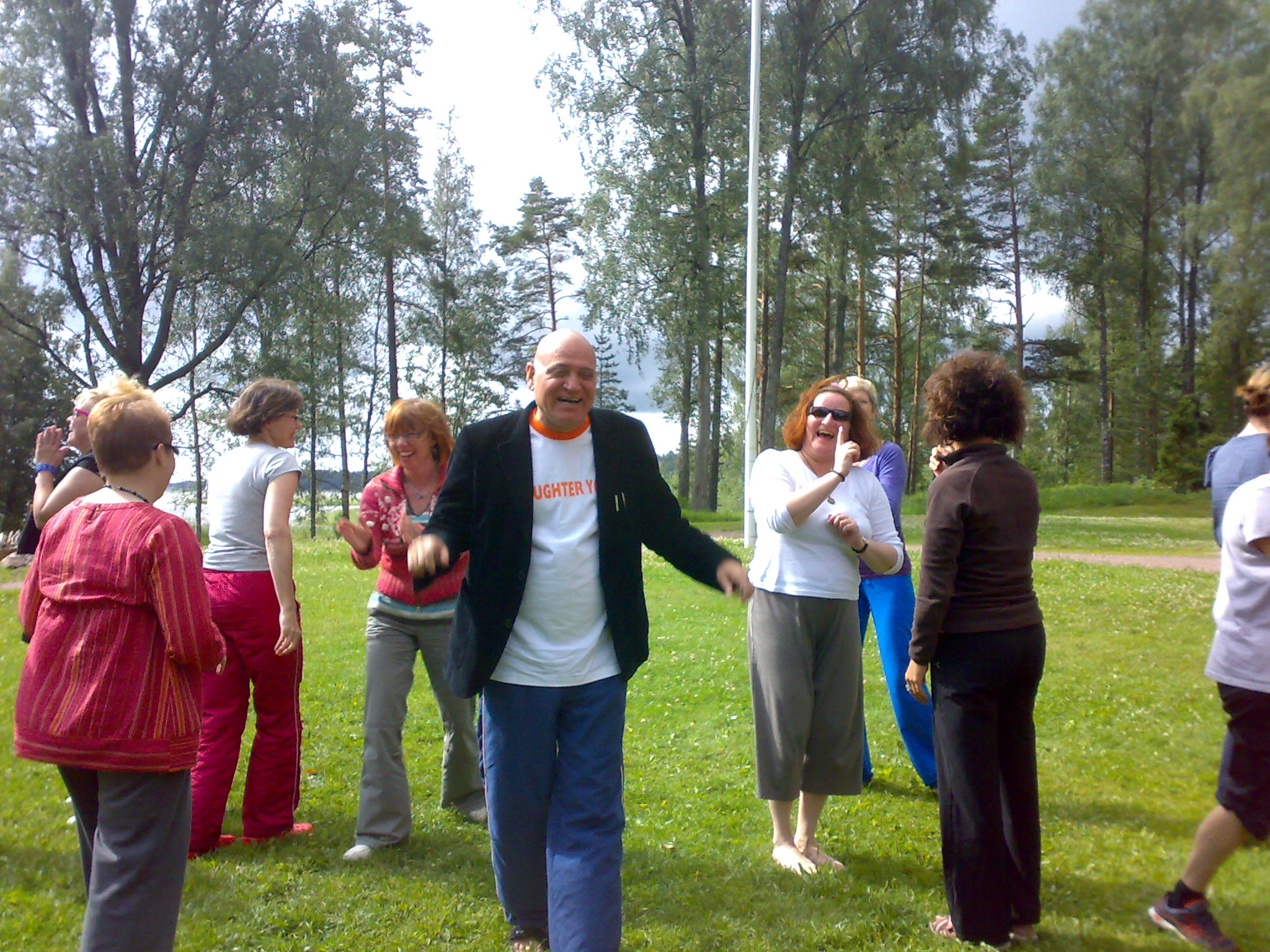
Laughter therapy/yoga

Laughter has been used as a therapeutic tool for many years because it is a natural form of medicine. Laughter is available to everyone and it provides benefits to a person's physical, emotional, and social well-being. Some of the benefits of using laughter therapy are that it can relieve stress and relax the whole body. It can also boost the immune system and release endorphins to relieve pain. Additionally, laughter can help prevent heart disease by increasing blood flow and improving the function of blood vessels. Some of the emotional benefits include diminishing anxiety or fear, improving overall mood, and adding joy to one's life. Laughter is also known to reduce allergic reactions in a preliminary study related to dust mite allergy sufferers.

Laughter therapy also has some social benefits, such as strengthening relationships, improving teamwork and reducing conflicts, and making oneself more attractive to others. Therefore, whether a person is trying to cope with a terminal illness or just trying to manage their stress or anxiety levels, laughter therapy can be a significant enhancement to their life.

Ramon Mora-Ripoll in his study on The Therapeutic Value Of Laughter In Medicine, stated that laughter therapy is an inexpensive and simple tool that can be used in patient care. It is a tool that is only beneficial when experienced and shared. Care givers need to recognize the importance of laughter and possess the right attitude to pass it on. He went on to say that since this type of therapy is not widely practiced, health care providers will have to learn how to effectively use it. In another survey, researchers looked at how Occupational Therapists and other care givers viewed and used humor with patients as a means of therapy. Many agreed that while they believed it was beneficial to the patients, the proper training was lacking in order to effectively use It. Even though laughter and humor has been used therapeutically in medical conditions, according to Mora-Ripoll, there was not enough data to clearly establish that laughter could be used as an overall means of healing. It did suggest that additional research was still needed since "well-designed randomized controlled trials have not been conducted to date validating the therapeutic efficacy of laughter."

In 2017, an institution in Japan conducted an open-label randomized controlled trial to evaluate the effects of laughter therapy on quality of life in patients with cancer. The study used laughter yoga, comedy, clown and jokes. The result showed that laughter therapy was helpful in improving quality of life and cancer symptoms in some areas for cancer survivors. Improvements were seen in the area of depression, anxiety and stress levels. There were limited harmful side effects. Laughter therapy should be used in conjunction with other cancer treatment.

== Research ==
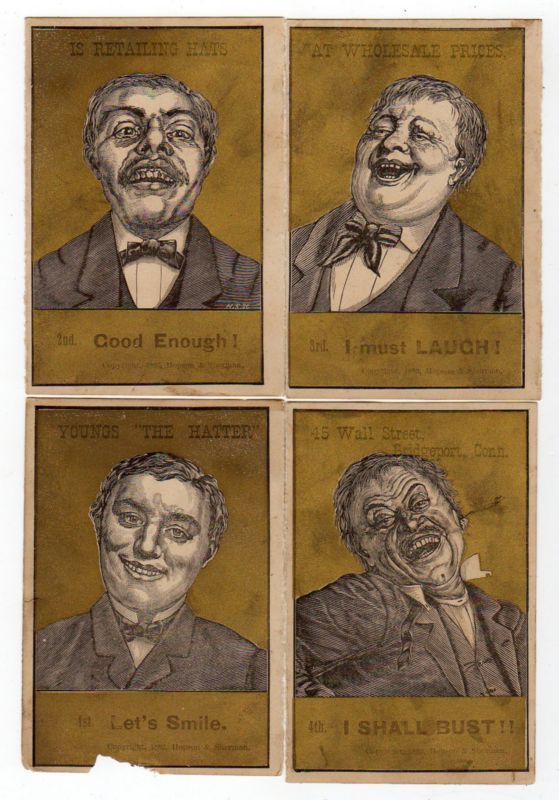
Late 19th-century or early 20th-century depiction of different stages of laughter on advertising cards

There is a wide range of experiences with laughter. A 1999 study by two humor researchers asked 80 people to keep a daily laughter record, and found they laughed an average of 18 times per day. However, their study also found a wide range, with some people laughing as many as 89 times per day, and others laughing as few as 0 times per day.

Carlo Bellieni examined laughter in an essay published in New Ideas in Psychology. He wrote we can strip back laughter to a three-step process. First, it needs a situation that seems odd and induces a sense of incongruity (bewilderment or panic). Second, the worry or stress the incongruous situation has provoked must be worked out and overcome (resolution). Third, the actual release of laughter acts as an all-clear siren to alert bystanders (relief) that they are safe.

== Laughter in literature and philosophy ==
Laughter in literature, although considered understudied by some, is a subject that has received attention in the written word for millennia. The use of humor and laughter in literary works (for example the homeric laughter (ἄσβεστος γέλως, ásbestos gélōs, "unceasing laughter") in Greek epics like the Iliad and Odyssey) has been studied and analyzed by many thinkers and writers, from the Ancient Greek philosophers onward. Henri Bergson's Laughter: An Essay on the Meaning of the Comic (Le rire, 1901) is a notable 20th-century contribution.

=== Ancient writers ===
==== Herodotus ====
For Herodotus, laughers can be distinguished into three types:

- Those who are innocent of wrongdoing, but ignorant of their own vulnerability
- Those who are mad
- Those who are overconfident

According to Donald Lateiner, Herodotus reports about laughter for valid literary and historiological reasons. "Herodotus believes either that both nature (better, the gods' direction of it) and human nature coincide sufficiently, or that the latter is but an aspect or analogue of the former, so that to the recipient the outcome is suggested." When reporting laughter, Herodotus does so in the conviction that it tells the reader something about the future and/or the character of the person laughing. It is also in this sense that it is not coincidental that in about 80% of the times when Herodotus speaks about laughter it is followed by a retribution. "Men whose laughter deserves report are marked, because laughter connotes scornful disdain, disdain feeling of superiority, and this feeling and the actions which stem from it attract the wrath of the gods."

==== Psalms ====
In the Hebrew Bible, the returning exiles who came from Babylon to Jerusalem celebrated their return with laughter and "shouts of joy.

=== Modern philosophers ===
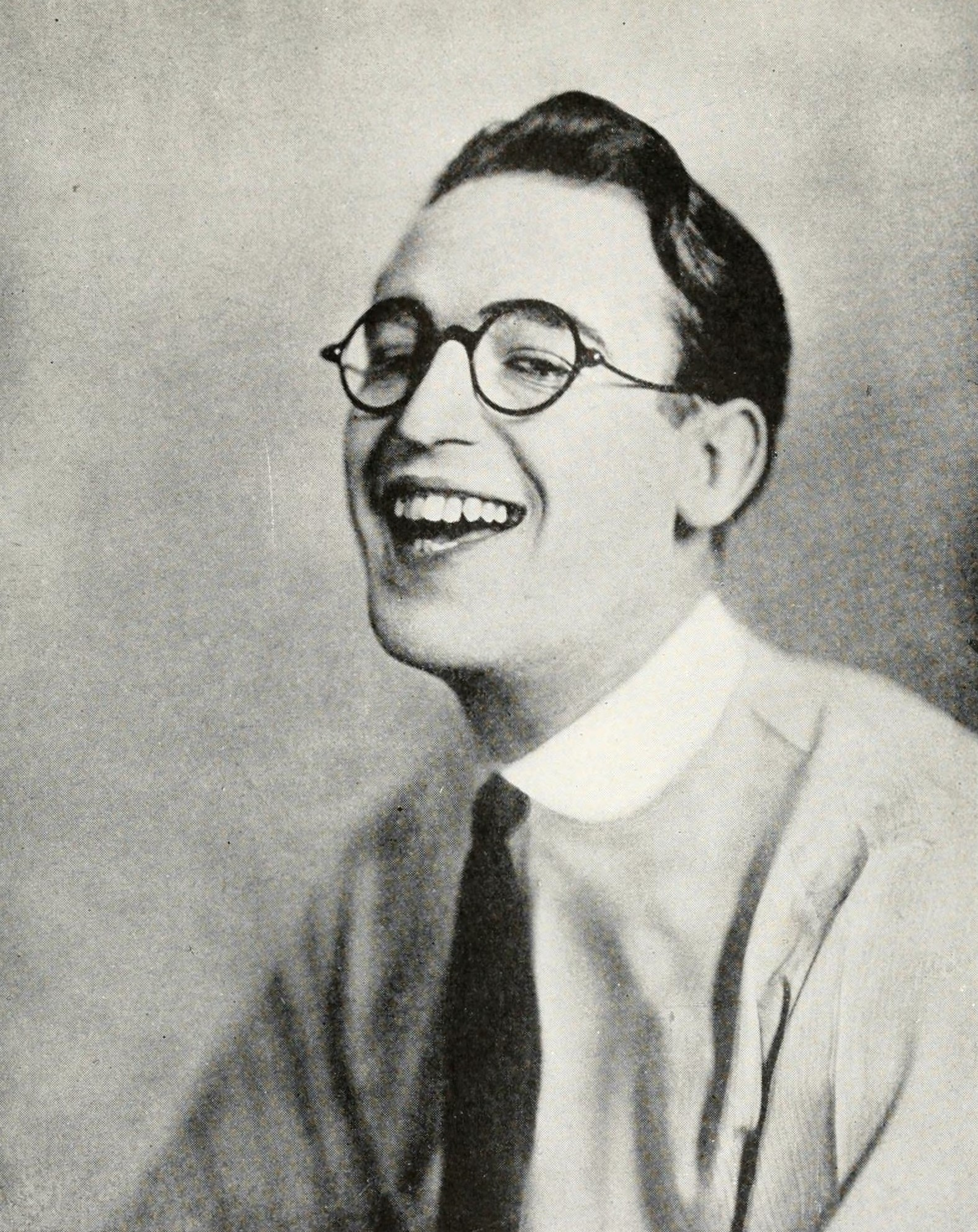
Comedian Harold Lloyd laughing

==== Hobbes ====
Thomas Hobbes wrote, "The passion of laughter is nothing else but sudden glory arising from sudden conception of some eminency in ourselves, by comparison with the infirmity of others, or with our own formerly."

==== Schopenhauer ====
Philosopher Arthur Schopenhauer devotes the 13th chapter of the first part of his major work, The World as Will and Representation, to laughter.

==== Nietzsche ====
Friedrich Nietzsche distinguishes two different purposes for the use of laughter. In a positive sense, "man uses the comical as a therapy against the restraining jacket of logic, morality and reason. He needs from time to time a harmless demotion from reason and hardship and in this sense laughter has a positive character for Nietzsche." Laughter can, however, also have a negative connotation when it is used for the expression of social conflict. This is expressed, for instance, in The Gay Science: "Laughter – Laughter means to be schadenfroh, but with clear conscience."

"Possibly Nietzsche's works would have had a totally different effect, if the playful, ironical and joking in his writings would have been factored in better."

==== Bergson ====
In Laughter: An Essay on the Meaning of the Comic, French philosopher Henri Bergson, renowned for his philosophical studies on materiality, memory, life and consciousness, tries to determine the laws of the comic and to understand the fundamental causes of comic situations. His method consists in determining the causes of the comic instead of analyzing its effects. He also deals with laughter in relation to human life, collective imagination and art, to have a better knowledge of society. One of the theories of the essay is that laughter, as a collective activity, has a social and moral role, in forcing people to eliminate their vices. It is a factor of uniformity of behaviours, as it condemns ludicrous and eccentric behaviours.

==== Ludovici ====
Anthony Ludovici developed the thoughts of Hobbes even further in The Secret of Laughter. His conviction is that there is something sinister in laughter, and that the modern omnipresence of humour and the idolatry of it are signs of societal weakness, as instinctive resort to humour became a sort of escapism from responsibility and action. Ludovici considered laughter to be an evolutionary trait and he offered many examples of different triggers for laughter with their own distinct explanations.

== Other animals ==
Several non-human species including rats, apes and dolphins demonstrate vocalizations that sound similar to human laughter.

== See also ==
- Death from laughter
- Evil laughter
- Laughter yoga
- Paradoxical laughter
- Pathological laughing and crying
- Smile
