= Amygdalohippocampal area =

Details

Identifiers
- Latin: area parahippocampalis
- NeuroNames: 2028
- TA98: A14.1.09.404
- FMA: 77607

Amygdalohippocampal area is a cytoarchitecturally defined portion of the periamygdalar area and the cortical amygdalar nucleus at the caudal extreme of the amygdala.
