= Stimulant psychosis =

Mental disorder caused by excess use of stimulant drugs

- Other names: Stimulant-induced psychotic disorder, SIPD
- Specialty: Psychiatry, addiction psychiatry
- Symptoms: Delusions, paranoia, hallucinations, insomnia
- Complications: Self-harm, suicide
- Causes: Stimulants, methamphetamine, cocaine
- Risk factors: Pre-existing psychosis or schizophrenia, personal or family history of mental illness
- Treatment: Atypical antipsychotics

Stimulant psychosis, also known as stimulant-induced psychotic disorder, is a mental disorder characterized by psychotic symptoms such as hallucinations, delusions, severe paranoia, disorganized thinking, and grossly disorganized behavior. It typically occurs following an overdose or several day binge on psychostimulants (such as cocaine and methamphetamine), although it can occur in the course of stimulant therapy, particularly at higher doses. One study reported occurrences at regularly prescribed doses in approximately 0.1% of individuals within the first several weeks after starting amphetamine or methylphenidate therapy. Methamphetamine psychosis, or long-term effects of stimulant use in the brain (at the molecular level), depend upon genetics and may persist for months or years. Psychosis may also result from withdrawal from stimulants, particularly when psychotic symptoms were present during use.

The most common causative agents are substituted amphetamines, including substituted cathinones, as well as certain dopamine reuptake inhibitors such as cocaine and phenidates.

== Signs and symptoms ==
The symptoms of stimulant psychosis vary depending on the drug ingested, but generally involve the symptoms of organic psychosis such as hallucinations, delusions, and severe paranoia. Other symptoms may include psychomotor agitation, manic behavior, aggression and/or violent tendencies.

== Cause ==
=== Substituted amphetamines ===
Drugs in the class of amphetamines, or substituted amphetamines, are known to induce "amphetamine psychosis" typically when chronically abused or used in high doses. In an Australian study of 309 active methamphetamine users, 13% had experienced a clinical level psychosis in the past year. Commonly abused amphetamines include methamphetamine, MDMA, and 4-FA, as well as substituted cathinones like α-PVP, MDPV, and mephedrone (4-MMC), though a large number of other closely related compounds have been recently synthesized. Methylphenidate is sometimes incorrectly included in this class, although it is nonetheless still capable of producing stimulant psychosis.

The symptoms of amphetamine psychosis include auditory hallucinations, visual hallucinations, tactile hallucinations, delusions of persecution, delusions of grandeur, and delusions of reference concurrent with both clear consciousness and prominent severe agitation. A Japanese study of recovery from methamphetamine psychosis reported a 64% recovery rate within 10 days rising to an 82% recovery rate at 30 days after methamphetamine cessation. However it has been suggested that around 5–15% of users fail to make a complete recovery in the long term. Furthermore, even at a small dose, the psychosis can be quickly reestablished. Psychosocial stress has been found to be an independent risk factor for psychosis relapse even without further substituted amphetamine use in certain cases.

The symptoms of acute amphetamine psychosis are very similar to those of the acute phase of schizophrenia, although amphetamine psychosis has more visual hallucinations and rarely presents thought disorder. Amphetamine psychosis may be purely related to high drug usage, or high drug usage may trigger an underlying vulnerability to schizophrenia. There is some evidence that vulnerability to amphetamine psychosis and schizophrenia may be genetically related. Relatives of methamphetamine users with a history of amphetamine psychosis are five times more likely to have been diagnosed with schizophrenia than relatives of methamphetamine users without a history of amphetamine psychosis. The disorders are often distinguished by a rapid resolution of symptoms in amphetamine psychosis, while schizophrenia is more likely to follow a chronic course.

Although rare and not formally recognized, a condition known as Amphetamine Withdrawal Psychosis (AWP) may occur upon cessation of substituted amphetamine use and, as the name implies, involves psychosis that appears on withdrawal from substituted amphetamines. However, unlike similar disorders, in AWP, substituted amphetamines reduce rather than increase symptoms, and the psychosis or mania resolves with resumption of the previous dosing schedule.

=== Cocaine ===
Cocaine has a similar potential to induce temporary psychosis with more than half of cocaine abusers reporting at least some psychotic symptoms at some point. Typical symptoms include paranoid delusions that they are being followed and that their drug use is being watched, accompanied by hallucinations that support the delusional beliefs. Delusional parasitosis with formication ("cocaine bugs") is also a fairly common symptom.

Cocaine-induced psychosis shows sensitization toward the psychotic effects of the drug. This means that psychosis becomes more severe with repeated intermittent use.

=== Phenidates ===
Methylphenidate and its analogues (such as ethylphenidate, 4F-MPH, and isopropylphenidate) share similar pharmacological profiles as other norepinephrine-dopamine reuptake inhibitors. Chronic abuse of methylphenidate has the potential to lead to psychosis. Similar psychiatric side effects have been reported in a study of ethylphenidate. No studies regarding psychosis and 4F-MPH or isopropylphenidate have been conducted, but given their high DAT binding and cellular uptake activity, the possibility of stimulant psychosis remains.

=== Caffeine ===
There is limited evidence that caffeine, in high doses or when chronically abused, may induce psychosis in normal individuals and worsen pre-existing psychosis in those diagnosed with schizophrenia, particularly when unmedicated.

== Differential diagnosis ==
Though less common than stimulant psychosis, stimulant drugs such as cocaine and amphetamines, designer drugs such as "bath salts", as well as the dissociative drug phencyclidine (PCP) may also cause a theorized severe and life-threatening condition known as excited delirium. This condition manifests as a combination of hyperactive delirium, psychomotor agitation, hallucinations, delusional thinking, incoherent speech, disorientation, severe confusion, extreme anxiety, bizarre and/or violent behavior, insensitivity to pain, high body temperature, and hysterical strength. Despite some superficial similarities in presentation excited delirium is a distinct (and more serious) condition than stimulant psychosis. The existence of excited delirium is currently debated.

== Transition to schizophrenia ==
A 2019 systematic review and meta-analysis by Murrie et al. found that the pooled proportion of transition from amphetamine-induced psychosis to schizophrenia was 22% (5 studies, CI 14%–34%). This was lower than cannabis (34%) and hallucinogens (26%), but higher than opioid (12%), alcohol (10%), and sedative (9%) induced psychoses. Transition rates were slightly lower in older cohorts but were not affected by sex, country of the study, hospital or community location, urban or rural setting, diagnostic methods, or duration of follow-up.

== Treatment ==
Treatment consists of supportive care during the acute intoxication phase: maintaining hydration, body temperature, blood pressure, and heart rate at acceptable levels until the drug is sufficiently metabolized to allow vital signs to return to baseline. Atypical and typical antipsychotics have been shown to be helpful in the early stages of treatment, especially olanzapine over haloperidol. The benzodiazepines temazepam and triazolam at 30 mg and 0.5 mg (CNS and cardiorespiratory monitoring should be done if benzodiazepines are used with olanzapine; or CNS and respiratory monitoring for haloperidol), are highly effective if agitation, aggression, or violent behavior is apparent. In the instance of persistent psychosis after repeated stimulant use, electroconvulsive therapy has been beneficial in some cases. This is followed by abstinence from psychostimulants supported with counselling or medication designed to assist with preventing a relapse and the resumption of a psychotic state.

== See also ==
- Cannabis-induced psychotic disorder (CIPD)
- Hallucinogen-induced psychotic disorder (HIPD)
- Psychosis
- Stimulant use disorder
- Substance-induced psychosis
