= Hallucinogen =

Class of drugs

- Drug class
- Chemical structure of psilocybin, the main active constituent of psilocybin-containing mushrooms and one of the most well-known hallucinogens.

Class identifiers
- Synonyms: Psychedelic; Entheogen; Psychotomimetic
- Use: Recreational, spiritual, medical
- Mechanism of action: Various
- Biological target: Various
- Chemical class: Various

Legal status
- Legal status: Variable

Hallucinogens, also known as psychedelics, entheogens, or historically as psychotomimetics, are a broad and diverse class of psychoactive drugs that can induce altered states of consciousness characterized by marked changes in perception, mood, cognition, and self-experience, along with a range of other psychological alterations. Hallucinogens are often categorized as either being psychedelics, dissociatives, or deliriants, but not all hallucinogens fall into these three classes.

== Types and examples ==
Types and examples of hallucinogens include the following:

- Psychedelics (5-HT_{2A} receptor agonists) like LSD, psilocybin, mescaline, and DMT
- Dissociatives (NMDA receptor antagonists) like ketamine, PCP, DXM, and nitrous oxide
- Deliriants (antimuscarinics) like scopolamine, diphenhydramine, and trihexyphenidyl
- κ-Opioid receptor agonists like salvinorin A, pentazocine, and levorphanol
- GABA_{A} receptor agonists like muscimol and gaboxadol
- Oneirogens (unknown mechanism) like ibogaine and harmaline
- Cannabinoids (CB_{1} receptor agonists) like THC, nabilone, and JWH-018
- Others like carbogen, hallucinogenic bolete mushrooms, and nutmeg

== Definition ==
=== Characteristics ===
Leo Hollister gave five criteria for classifying a drug as hallucinogenic. This definition is broad enough to include a wide range of drugs and has since been shown to encompass a number of categories of drugs with different pharmacological mechanisms and behavioral effects. Richard Glennon has thus given an additional two criteria that narrow the category down to classical hallucinogens. Hollister's criteria for hallucinogens were as follows:

- in proportion to other effects, changes in thought, perception, and mood should predominate;
- intellectual or memory impairment should be minimal;
- stupor, narcosis, or excessive stimulation should not be an integral effect;
- autonomic nervous system side effects should be minimal; and
- addictive craving should be absent.

Glennon's additional criteria for classical hallucinogens are that the drugs in question must also:

- bind at 5-HT_{2} serotonin receptors; and
- be recognized by animals trained to discriminate the drug DOM from vehicle.

=== Nomenclature and taxonomy ===
Most hallucinogens can be categorized based on their pharmacological mechanisms as psychedelics (which are serotonergic), dissociatives (which are generally antiglutamatergic), or deliriants (which are generally anticholinergic). However, the pharmacological mechanisms of some hallucinogens, such as salvinorin A and ibogaine, do not fit into any of those categories. Entactogens and cannabinoids are also sometimes considered hallucinogens. Nonetheless, while the term hallucinogen is often used to refer to the broad class of drugs covered in this article, sometimes it is used to mean only classical hallucinogens (that is, psychedelics). Because of this, it is important to consult the definition given in a particular source. Because of the multi-faceted phenomenology brought on by hallucinogens, efforts to create standardized terminology for classifying them based on their subjective effects have not succeeded to date.

Classical hallucinogens or psychedelics have been described by many names. David E. Nichols wrote in 2004:

Many different names have been proposed over the years for this drug class. The famous German toxicologist Louis Lewin used the name phantastica earlier in this century, and as we shall see later, such a descriptor is not so farfetched. The most popular names—hallucinogen, psychotomimetic, and psychedelic ("mind manifesting")—have often been used interchangeably. Hallucinogen is now, however, the most common designation in the scientific literature, although it is an inaccurate descriptor of the actual effects of these drugs. In the lay press, the term psychedelic is still the most popular and has held sway for nearly four decades. Most recently, there has been a movement in nonscientific circles to recognize the ability of these substances to provoke mystical experiences and evoke feelings of spiritual significance. Thus, the term entheogen, derived from the Greek word entheos, which means "god within", was introduced by Ruck et al. and has seen increasing use. This term suggests that these substances reveal or allow a connection to the "divine within". Although it seems unlikely that this name will ever be accepted in formal scientific circles, its use has dramatically increased in the popular media and on internet sites. Indeed, in much of the counterculture that uses these substances, entheogen has replaced psychedelic as the name of choice and we may expect to see this trend continue.

Robin Carhart-Harris and Guy Goodwin write that the term psychedelic is preferable to hallucinogen for describing classical psychedelics because of the term hallucinogen's "arguably misleading emphasis on these compounds' hallucinogenic properties." However, others such as Nichols disagree and feel that the term psychedelic should be reserved to described serotonergic psychedelics specifically as it has been historically.

Certain hallucinogens are designer drugs, such as those in the 2C and 25-NB (NBOMe) families. A designer drug is a structural or functional analog of a controlled substance (hallucinogenic or otherwise) that has been designed to mimic the pharmacological effects of the original drug while at the same time avoid being classified as illegal (by specification as a research chemical) and/or avoid detection in standard drug tests.

== Effects by type ==
Different classes of hallucinogens have different mechanisms of action and effects.

=== Psychedelics ===
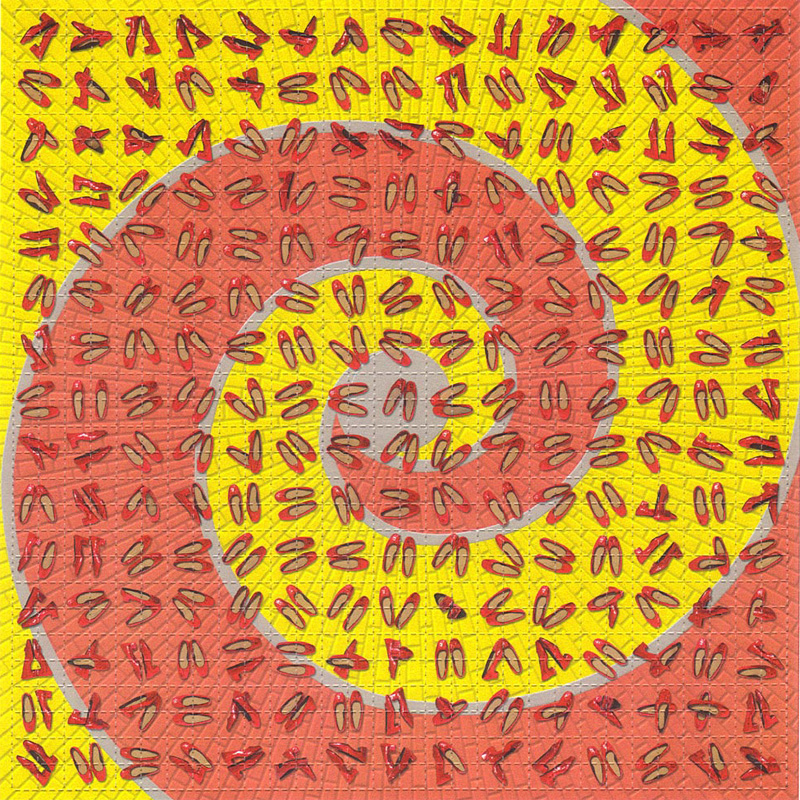
A blotter sheet of LSD.

Psychedelics, also known as serotonergic psychedelics or classical hallucinogens, are serotonin 5-HT_{2A} receptor agonists with hallucinogenic effects. Despite several attempts that have been made, starting in the 19th and 20th centuries, to define common phenomenological structures (i.e., patterns of experience) brought on by classical psychedelics, a universally accepted taxonomy does not yet exist.

A prominent element of psychedelic experiences is visual alteration. Psychedelic visual alteration often includes spontaneous formation of complex flowing geometric visual patterning in the visual field. When the eyes are open, the visual alteration is overlaid onto the objects and spaces in the physical environment; when the eyes are closed the visual alteration is seen in the "inner world" behind the eyelids. These visual effects increase in complexity with higher dosages, and also when the eyes are closed. The visual alteration does not normally constitute hallucinations, because the person undergoing the experience can still distinguish between real and internally generated visual phenomena, though in some cases, true hallucinations are present. More rarely, psychedelic experiences can include complex hallucinations of objects, animals, people, or even whole landscapes.

A number of studies by Roland R. Griffiths and other researchers have concluded that high doses of psilocybin and other classic psychedelics trigger mystical experiences in most research participants. Mystical experiences have been measured by a number of psychometric scales, including the Hood Mysticism Scale, the Spiritual Transcendence Scale, and the Mystical Experience Questionnaire. The revised version of the Mystical Experience Questionnaire, for example, asks participants about four dimensions of their experience, namely the "mystical" quality, positive mood such as the experience of amazement, the loss of the usual sense of time and space, and the sense that the experience cannot be adequately conveyed through words. The questions on the "mystical" quality in turn probe multiple aspects: the sense of "pure" being, the sense of unity with one's surroundings, the sense that what one experienced was real, and the sense of sacredness. Some researchers have questioned the interpretation of the results from these studies and whether the framework and terminology of mysticism are appropriate in a scientific context, while other researchers have responded to those criticisms and argued descriptions of mystical experiences are compatible with a scientific worldview.

Link R. Swanson divides overarching scientific frameworks for understanding psychedelic experiences into two waves. In the first wave, encompassing nineteenth- and twentieth-century frameworks, he includes model psychosis theory (the psychotomimetic paradigm), filtration theory, and psychoanalytic theory. In the second wave of theories, encompassing twenty-first-century frameworks, Swanson includes entropic brain theory, integrated information theory, and predictive processing. It is from the paradigm of filtration theory that the term psychedelic derives. Aldous Huxley and Humphrey Osmond applied the pre-existing ideas of filtration theory, which held that the brain filters what enters into consciousness, to explain psychedelic experiences; Huxley believed that the brain was filtering reality itself and that psychedelics granted conscious access to "Mind at Large", whereas Osmond believed that the brain was filtering aspects of the mind out of consciousness. Swanson writes that Osmond's view seems "less radical, more compatible with materialist science, and less epistemically and ontologically committed" than Huxley's.

=== Dissociatives ===
Dissociatives produce analgesia, amnesia and catalepsy at anesthetic doses. They also produce a sense of detachment from the surrounding environment, hence "the state has been designated as dissociative anesthesia since the patient truly seems disassociated from his environment." Dissociative symptoms include the disruption or compartmentalization of "...the usually integrated functions of consciousness, memory, identity or perception."^{p. 523} Dissociation of sensory input can cause derealization, the perception of the outside world as being dream-like, vague or unreal. Other dissociative experiences include depersonalization, which includes feeling dissociated from one's personality; feeling unreal; feeling able to observe one's actions but not actively take control; being unable to associate with one's self in the mirror while maintaining rational awareness that the image in the mirror is the same person. In a 2004 paper, Daphne Simeon offered "...common descriptions of depersonalisation experiences: watching oneself from a distance (similar to watching a movie); candid out-of-body experiences; a sense of just going through the motions; one part of the self acting/participating while the other part is observing;...."

The classical dissociatives achieve their effect through blocking binding of the neurotransmitter glutamate to NMDA receptors (NMDA receptor antagonism) and include ketamine, methoxetamine (MXE), phencyclidine (PCP), dextromethorphan (DXM), and nitrous oxide.

Some dissociatives can have CNS depressant effects, thereby carrying similar risks as opioids, which can slow breathing or heart rate to levels resulting in death (when using very high doses). DXM in higher doses can increase heart rate and blood pressure and still depress respiration. Inversely, PCP can have more unpredictable effects and has often been classified as a stimulant and a depressant in some texts along with being as a dissociative. While many have reported that they "feel no pain" while under the effects of PCP, DXM and Ketamine, this does not fall under the usual classification of anesthetics in recreational doses (anesthetic doses of DXM may be dangerous). Rather, true to their name, they process pain as a kind of "far away" sensation; pain, although present, becomes a disembodied experience and there is much less emotion associated with it. As for probably the most common dissociative, nitrous oxide, the principal risk seems to be due to oxygen deprivation. Injury from falling is also a danger, as nitrous oxide may cause sudden loss of consciousness, an effect of oxygen deprivation. Because of the high level of physical activity and relative imperviousness to pain induced by PCP, some deaths have been reported due to the release of myoglobin from ruptured muscle cells. High amounts of myoglobin can induce renal shutdown.

Many users of dissociatives have been concerned about the possibility of NMDA antagonist neurotoxicity (NAN). This concern is partly due to William E. White, the author of the DXM FAQ, who claimed that dissociatives definitely cause brain damage. The argument was criticized on the basis of lack of evidence and White retracted his claim. White's claims and the ensuing criticism surrounded original research by John Olney.

In 1989, John Olney discovered that neuronal vacuolation and other cytotoxic changes ("lesions") occurred in brains of rats administered NMDA antagonists, including PCP and ketamine. Repeated doses of NMDA antagonists led to cellular tolerance and hence continuous exposure to NMDA antagonists did not lead to cumulative neurotoxic effects. Antihistamines such as diphenhydramine, barbiturates and even diazepam have been found to prevent NAN. LSD and DOB have also been found to prevent NAN.

=== Deliriants ===
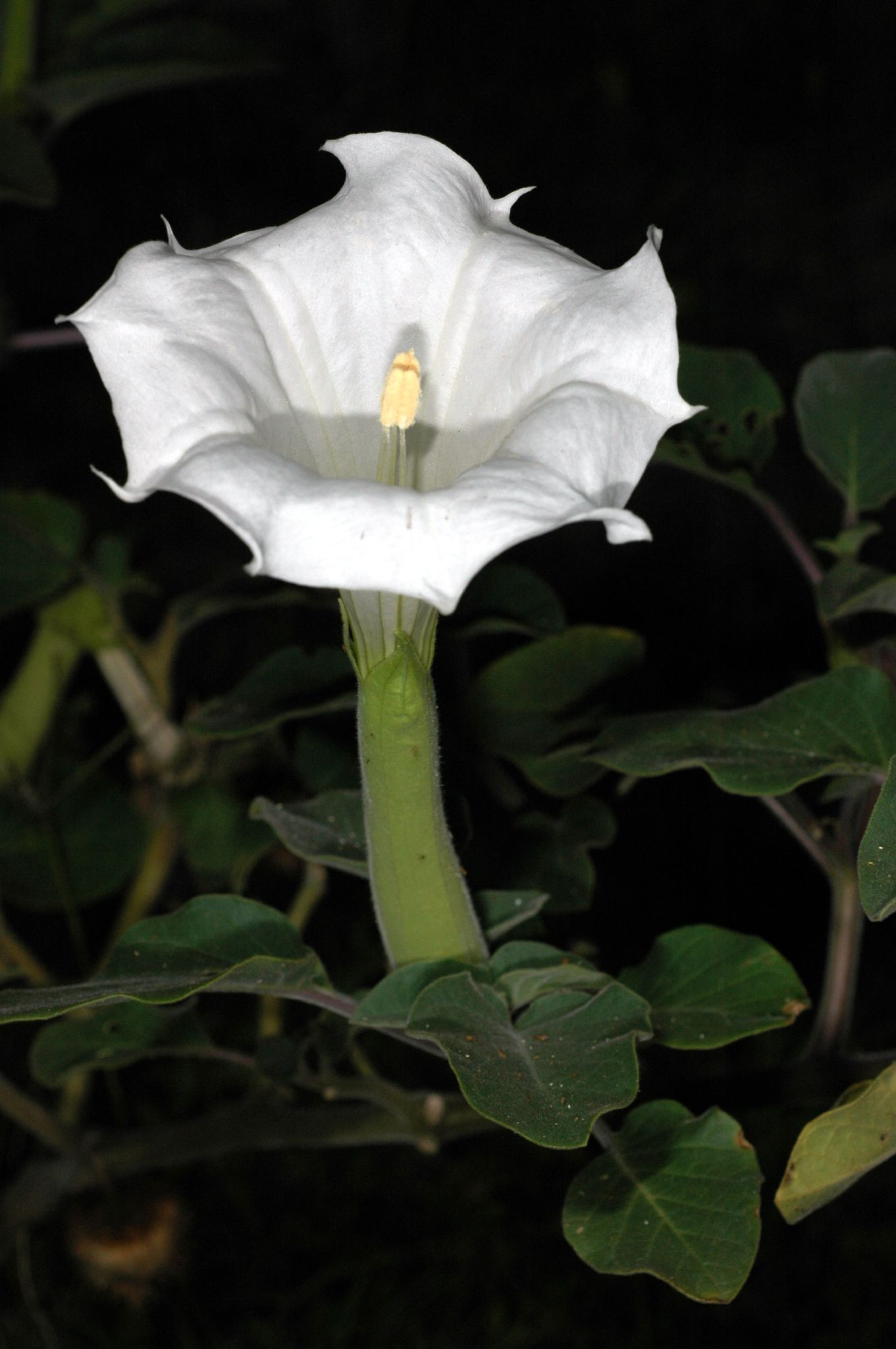
Datura innoxia in flower

Deliriants, as their name implies, induce a state of delirium in the user, characterized by extreme confusion and an inability to control one's actions. They are called deliriants because their subjective effects are similar to the experiences of people with delirious fevers. The term was introduced by David F. Duncan and Robert S. Gold to distinguish these drugs from psychedelics and dissociatives, such as LSD and ketamine respectively, due to their primary effect of causing delirium, as opposed to the more lucid states produced by the other hallucinogens.

Despite the fully legal status of several common deliriant plants, deliriants are largely unpopular as recreational drugs due to the severe, generally unpleasant and often dangerous nature of the hallucinogenic effects produced.

Classical deliriants are those which are anticholinergic, meaning they block the muscarinic acetylcholine receptors. Many of these compounds are produced naturally by plant genera belonging to the nightshade family Solanaceae, such as Datura, Brugmansia and Latua in the New World and Atropa, Hyoscyamus and Mandragora in the Old World. These tropane alkaloids are poisonous and can cause death due to tachycardia-induced heart failure and hyperthermia even in small doses. Additionally, over-the-counter antihistamines such as diphenhydramine (brand name Benadryl) and dimenhydrinate (brand name Dramamine) also have an anticholinergic effect.

=== Oneirogens ===
Oneirogens like ibogaine and harmaline are said to produce oneirophrenia, or a dream-like state of consciousness. This state is unique and different from other hallucinogens. They increase fantasy, vividity of visual imagery, spontaneity of thought content, long-term memory recall, and closure of unresolved emotional conflicts, among other effects. Overt hallucinogenic effects like with serotonergic psychedelics, such as formal alterations or deterioration of thinking, depersonalization, psychotic-like effects such as delusions, and perceptual changes of one's environment, are absent.

=== Others ===
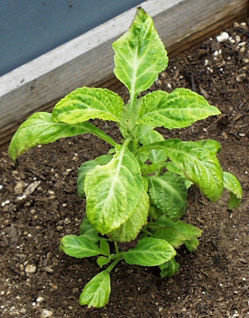
Salvia divinorum.

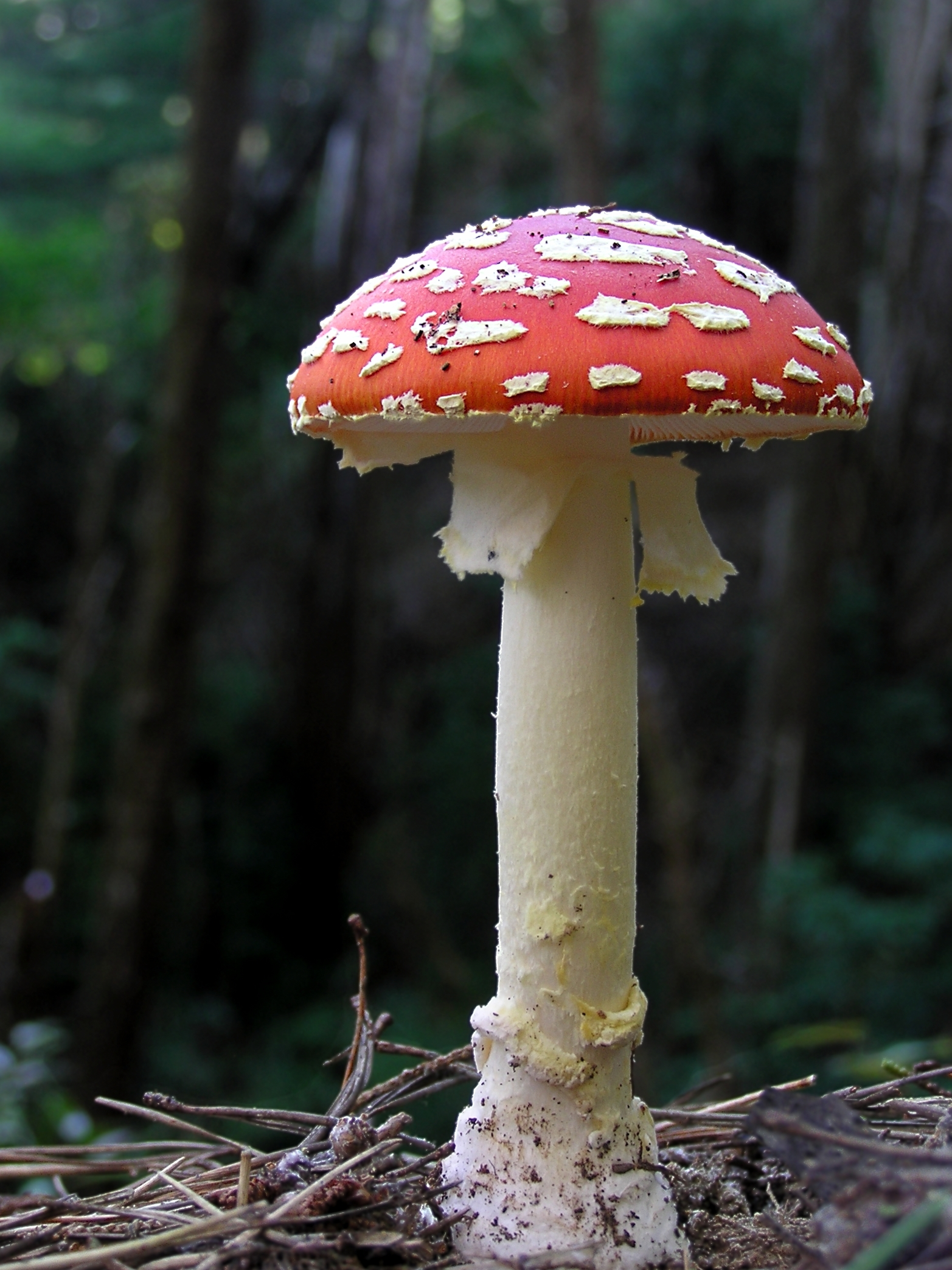
Single fruiting body of Amanita muscaria

Other hallucinogens, including κ-opioid receptor agonists such as Salvia divinorum or salvinorin A, GABA_{A} receptor agonists like Amanita muscaria or muscimol, and cannabinoids like cannabis or Δ^{9}-tetrahydrocannabinol (THC), have their own varieties of hallucinogenic effects. In addition, hallucinogenic bolete mushrooms have been associated with other types of hallucinations, such as Lilliputian hallucinations. Aminochromes like adrenochrome and adrenolutin have been claimed to be hallucinogenic by Abram Hoffer, Humphry Osmond and colleagues, although the validity of these claims is disputed. Uncured tobacco has been reported to produce deliriant-esque effects due to its intoxicatingly high levels of nicotine.

=== Psychotomimetic paradigm ===
While early researchers believed certain hallucinogens mimicked the effects of schizophrenia, it has since been discovered that some hallucinogens resemble endogenous psychoses more than others. PCP and ketamine more closely resemble endogenous psychoses because they reproduce both positive and negative symptoms of psychoses, while psilocybin and related hallucinogens typically produce effects resembling only the positive symptoms of schizophrenia. While the serotonergic psychedelics (LSD, psilocybin, mescaline, etc.) do produce subjective effects distinct from NMDA antagonist dissociatives (PCP, ketamine, dextrorphan), there is clear overlap in the mental processes that these drugs affect and research has discovered that there is overlap in the mechanisms by which both these types of hallucinogens mimic psychotic symptoms. One double-blind study examining the differences between DMT and ketamine hypothesized that classically psychedelic drugs most resemble paranoid schizophrenia while dissociative drugs best mimicked catatonic subtypes or otherwise undifferentiated schizophrenia. The researchers stated that their findings supported the view that "a heterogeneous disorder like schizophrenia is unlikely to be modeled accurately by a single pharmacological agent."

== Adverse effects ==
No clear connection has been made between serotonergic psychedelics and organic brain damage. Hallucinogen-induced psychotic disorder (HIPD) is a psychotic disorder caused by hallucinogens and has an occurrence rate of 0.6% in randomized controlled trials. Hallucinogen persisting perception disorder (HPPD) is a diagnosed condition wherein certain visual effects of hallucinogenic drugs persist for a long time after taking it, and is most often found in frequent users of hallucinogens.

A large epidemiological study in the U.S. found that other than personality disorders and other substance use disorders, lifetime hallucinogen use was not associated with other mental disorders, and that risk of developing a hallucinogen use disorder was very low.

=== Hallucinogen-induced psychotic disorder ===
Hallucinogen-induced psychotic disorder (HIPD) is a type of substance-induced psychosis. HIPD due to psychedelics is most commonly seen with LSD use, but can also be caused by other psychedelics. The symptoms of hallucinogen-induced psychotic disorder are psychosis with paranoia, delusions, hallucinations, or disorganized thinking that persist beyond the effects of the drug. Hallucinogen-induced psychotic disorder is a medical emergency. Without treatment, the psychosis can persist for weeks or months. HIPD is treated with an atypical antipsychotic medication such as aripiprazole, quetiapine, olanzapine, or risperidone. Individuals with a personal or family history of mental health issues are at the highest risk for hallucinogen-induced psychotic disorder.

A 2019 systematic review and meta-analysis by Murrie and colleagues found that the transition rate from a diagnosis of hallucinogen-induced psychotic disorder to schizophrenia was 26% (CI 14–43%), which was lower than cannabis-induced psychotic disorder (34%) but higher than amphetamine (22%), opioid (12%), alcohol (10%) and sedative (9%) induced psychoses. The specific hallucinogens included in the study were psychedelics and phencyclidine (PCP). A subsequent analysis with psychedelics only found a lower transition rate of 13% and that PCP had driven the higher rate in the previous research. Transition rates were not affected by sex, country of the study, hospital or community location, urban or rural setting, diagnostic methods, or duration of follow-up. In comparison, the transition rate for brief, atypical and not otherwise specified psychosis was found to be 36%.

== Chemistry ==
Hallucinogens can be divided into different classes with different mechanisms of action and structural scaffolds. Serotonergic psychedelics can be divided into three main chemical classes: tryptamines (such as psilocin and DMT), ergolines (such as LSD), and phenethylamines (such as mescaline). Tryptamines closely resemble serotonin chemically. Other types of hallucinogens belong to other structural classes, for instance arylcyclohexylamines like ketamine and phencyclidine (PCP) being the most major structural group in the case of dissociatives.

== History ==
=== Traditional religious and shamanic use ===
Historically, hallucinogens have been commonly used in religious or shamanic rituals. In this context they are referred to as entheogens, and are used to facilitate healing, divination, communication with spirits, and coming-of-age ceremonies. Evidence exists for the use of entheogens in prehistoric times, as well as in numerous ancient cultures, including Ancient Egyptian, Mycenaean, Ancient Greek, Vedic, Maya, Inca and Aztec cultures. The Upper Amazon is home to the strongest extant entheogenic tradition; the Urarina of the Peruvian Amazon, for instance, continue to practice an elaborate system of ayahuasca shamanism, coupled with an animistic belief system.

Shamans consume hallucinogenic substances in order to induce a trance. Once in this trance, shamans believe that they are able to communicate with the spirit world, and can see what is causing their patients' illness. The Aguaruna of Peru believe that many illnesses are caused by the darts of sorcerers. Under the influence of yaji, a hallucinogenic drink, Aguaruna shamans try to discover and remove the darts from their patients.

In the 1970s, Frida G. Surawicz and Richard Banta published a review of two case studies where hallucinogenic drug use appeared to play a role in "delusions of being changed into a wolf" (sometimes referred to as "lycanthropy," or being a "werewolf"). They described a patient whose delusion was thought to be caused by an altered state of consciousness "brought on by LSD and strychnine and continued casual marijuana use." The review was published in the Canadian Psychiatric Association Journal. While both central cases described white male patients from contemporary Appalachia, Surawicz and Banta generalized their conclusions about a link between hallucinogens and "lycanthropy," based on historical accounts that reference myriad types of pharmacologically-similar drug-use alongside descriptions of "lycanthropes."

=== Early scientific investigations ===
In an 1860 book, the mycologist Mordecai Cubitt Cooke differentiated a class of drugs roughly corresponding to hallucinogens from opiates, and in 1924 the toxicologist Louis Lewin described hallucinogens in depth under the name phantastica. From the 1920s on, work in psychopharmacology and ethnobotany resulted in more detailed knowledge of various hallucinogens. In 1943, Albert Hofmann discovered the hallucinogenic properties of lysergic acid diethylamide (LSD), which raised the prospect of hallucinogens becoming more broadly available.

=== Hallucinogens after World War II ===
After World War II there was an explosion of interest in hallucinogenic drugs in psychiatry, owing mainly to the invention of LSD. Interest in the drugs tended to focus on either the potential for psychotherapeutic applications of the drugs (see psychedelic psychotherapy), or on the use of hallucinogens to produce a "controlled psychosis", in order to understand psychotic disorders such as schizophrenia. By 1951, more than 100 articles on LSD had appeared in medical journals, and by 1961, the number had increased to more than 1,000 articles.

At the beginning of the 1950s, the existence of hallucinogenic drugs was virtually unknown to the general public in the West. However this soon changed as several influential figures were introduced to the hallucinogenic experience. Aldous Huxley's 1953 essay The Doors of Perception, describing his experiences with mescaline, and R. Gordon Wasson's 1957 Life magazine article ("Seeking the Magic Mushroom") brought the topic into the public limelight. In the early 1960s, counterculture icons such as Jerry Garcia, Timothy Leary, Allen Ginsberg and Ken Kesey advocated the drugs for their psychedelic effects, and a large subculture of psychedelic drug users was spawned. Psychedelic drugs played a major role in catalyzing the major social changes initiated in the 1960s. As a result of the growing popularity of LSD and disdain for the hippies with whom it was heavily associated, LSD was banned in the United States in 1967. This greatly reduced the clinical research about LSD, although limited experiments continued to take place, such as those conducted by Reese Jones in San Francisco.

As early as the 1960s, research into the medicinal properties of LSD was being conducted. According to pharmacologist David E. Nichols, "Savage et al. (1962) provided the earliest report of efficacy for a hallucinogen in OCD, where after two doses of LSD, a patient who suffered from depression and violent obsessive sexual thoughts experienced dramatic and permanent improvement".

Starting in the mid-20th century, psychedelic drugs have received extensive attention in the Western world. They have been and are being explored as potential therapeutic agents in treating alcoholism, and other forms of drug addiction.

== Society and culture ==
=== Etymology ===
The word hallucinogen is derived from the word hallucination. The term hallucinate dates back to around 1595–1605, and is derived from the Latin hallūcinātus, the past participle of (h)allūcināri, meaning "to wander in the mind."

=== Legal status and attitudes ===
In the U.S., classical hallucinogens (psychedelics) are in the most strictly prohibited class of drugs, known as Schedule 1 drugs. This classification was created for drugs that meet the three following characteristics: 1) they have no currently accepted medical use, 2) there is a lack of safety for their use under medical supervision, and 3) they have a high potential for abuse. However, pharmacologist David E. Nichols argues that hallucinogens were placed in this class for political rather than scientific reasons. In 2006, Albert Hofmann, the chemist who discovered LSD, said he believed LSD could be valuable when used in a medical rather than recreational context, and said it should be regulated in the same way as morphine rather than more strictly.

The Netherlands previously allowed psilocybin mushrooms to be sold, but in October 2007 the Dutch government moved to ban their sale following several widely publicized incidents involving tourists. In November 2020, Oregon became the first U.S. state to both decriminalize psilocybin and legalize it for therapeutic use, after Ballot Measure 109 passed.

=== Usage prevalence ===
A September 2025 national survey of American adults conducted by the RAND Corporation found that the most commonly used hallucinogens and related drugs (past-year use) were psilocybin (4.3%), MDMA or MDA (1.8%), Amanita muscaria (1.3%), ketamine (1.3%), LSD (1.1%), DMT (0.84%), mescaline (0.53%), 2C-B (0.46%), Salvia divinorum (0.43%), ibogaine or iboga (0.36%), and 5-MeO-DMT (0.30%). The survey also found that about 3.7% of adults had microdosed in the past year, with the most frequent drugs being psilocybin, MDMA, and LSD.

== See also ==
- Closed-eye visualization
- Hallucinogenic plants in Chinese herbals
- List of investigational hallucinogens and entactogens
- List of hallucinogens
- Out-of-body experience
- Psychedelia
- Psychedelic experience
- Psychonautics
- Psychopharmacology
- Trip killer
- Trip report
- Visual perception
