= Substance-induced psychosis =

Mental condition attributed to substance intoxication

- Other names: Substance-induced psychotic disorder, substance/medication-induced psychotic disorder, drug-induced psychosis, toxic psychosis, toxicophrenia
- Specialty: Psychiatry, addiction psychiatry, Emergency medicine
- Symptoms: Delusions, paranoia, hallucinations, insomnia
- Complications: Self-harm, suicide
- Causes: Various substances
- Risk factors: Pre-existing psychosis or schizophrenia, personal or family history of mental illness
- Treatment: Atypical antipsychotics

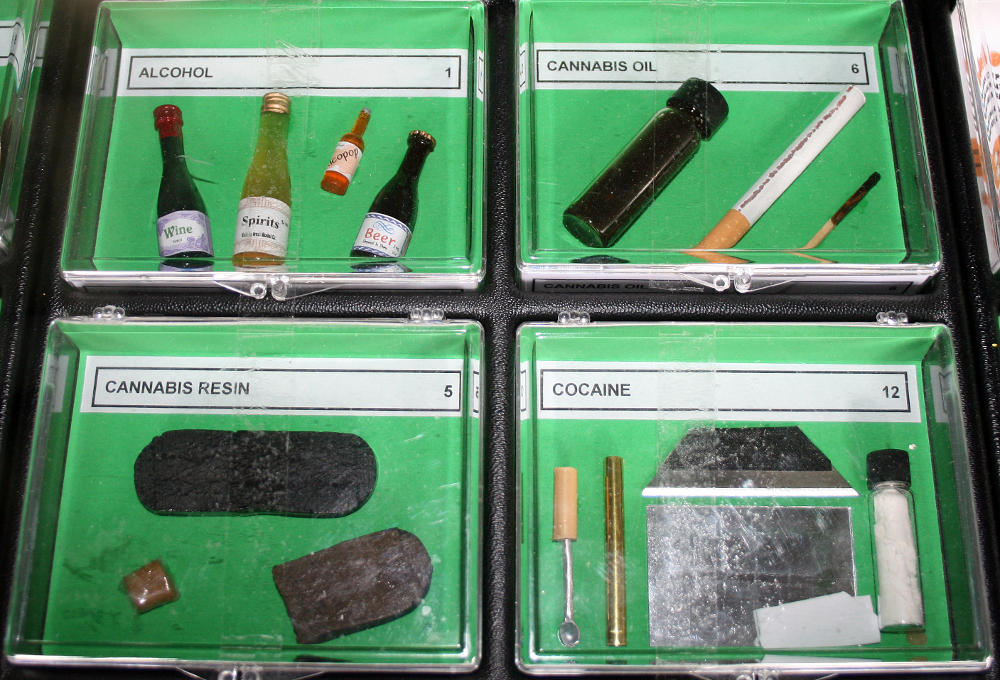
Alcohol, cannabis oil, cannabis resin, cocaine

Substance-induced psychosis (commonly known as toxic psychosis or drug-induced psychosis) is a form of psychosis that is attributed to substance intoxication, withdrawal or recent consumption of psychoactive drugs. It is a psychosis that results from the effects of various substances, such as medicinal and nonmedicinal substances, legal and illegal drugs, chemicals, and plants. Various psychoactive substances have been implicated in causing or worsening psychosis in users.

== Signs and symptoms ==
Substance-induced psychosis (SIP) often manifests as disorientation, paranoid delusions, visual hallucinations and/or tactile hallucinations. It is a state in which a person's mental capacity to recognize reality, communicate, and relate to others is impaired, thus interfering with the capacity to deal with life's demands. While there are many types of psychosis, the cause of substance-induced psychosis can be pinpointed to intake of specific chemicals. To properly diagnose Substance-Induced Psychotic Disorder, one must conclude that exhibited hallucinations or delusions began during intoxication, withdrawal, or within a month after use of the substance and the symptoms are not related to a non-substance-induced psychotic disorder.

== Treatment ==
Because substance-induced psychosis results from the consumption of a substance or combination of substances, treatment practices heavily rely on detoxification and discontinuation of the substance(s). Detox and addiction treatment centers may often provide rehabilitation programs, including inpatient and outpatient treatment options, support groups, and extended treatment plans. Substance-induced psychosis may persist for hours, days, or weeks, but typically resolves within a month of sobriety. Treating psychosis involves a very thorough evaluation, including medical history, family background, symptoms, and other potential causes. Treatment prioritizes emergent symptoms, evaluates for underlying mental illnesses such as bipolar disorder or schizophrenia, and focuses on behavioral and preventative measures against substance use.

=== Medication ===
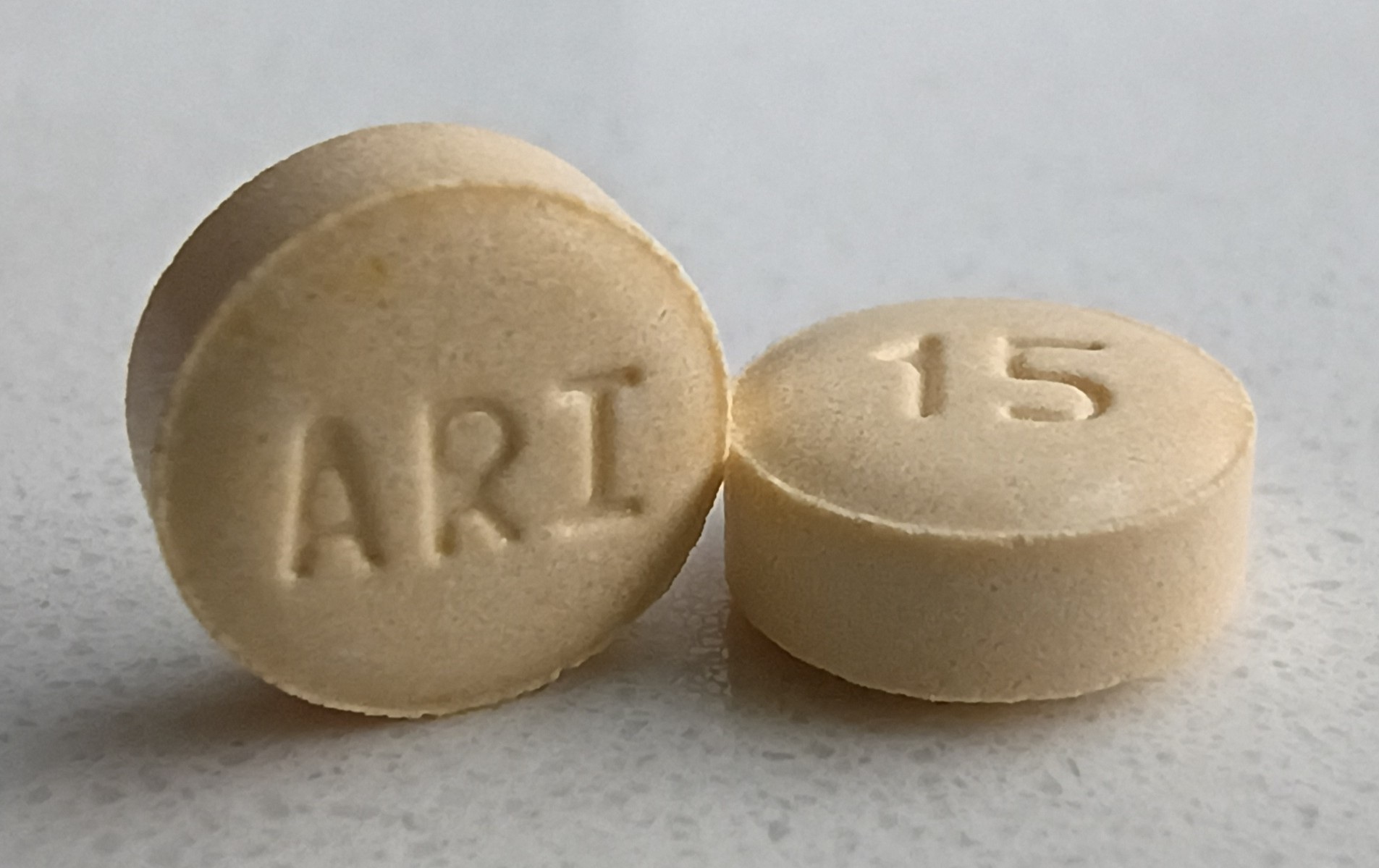
Aripiprazole 15 mg is a third-generation antipsychotic commonly used to treat substance-induced psychosis.

Antipsychotic medications are recommended to be used to treat substance-induced psychosis (SIP). Haloperidol, a first-generation, or typical antipsychotic, is frequently administered in emergency departments with good results. Patients are often switched to an atypical antipsychotic such as aripiprazole, quetiapine, olanzapine, or risperidone for maintenance therapy. Atypical antipsychotics, otherwise known as second and third-generation antipsychotics, are specifically recommended to be used for psychedelic-induced psychosis.

Third-generation antipsychotics that are used to treat substance-induced psychosis include aripiprazole, brexpiprazole, cariprazine, and lurasidone. Third-generation antipsychotics are distinguished for their improved tolerability and side effect profile compared to second and first-generation antipsychotics.

== Substance use and schizophrenia ==
Rates of drug use amongst people with schizophrenia are higher than the general population; 50% of those diagnosed with schizophrenia use substances over their life. There is a model that suggests this arises because those with schizophrenia self-medicate with psychoactive drugs.

== Transition to schizophrenia ==
A 2019 systematic review and meta-analysis found that 25% (18–38%) of people diagnosed with substance-induced psychosis went on to be diagnosed with schizophrenia, compared with 36% (30–43%) for brief, atypical and not otherwise specified psychoses. The substance present was the primary predictor of transition from drug-induced psychosis to schizophrenia, with highest rates associated with cannabis (34% (25–46%)), hallucinogens (26% (14–43%)) and amphetamines (22% (14–34%)). Lower rates were reported for opioid– (12% (8–18%)), alcohol– (9% (6–15%)) and sedative– (10% (7–15%)) induced psychoses. Transition rates were slightly lower in older cohorts but were not affected by sex, country of the study, hospital or community location, urban or rural setting, diagnostic methods, or duration of follow-up.

| Class of substance | Number of studies | Rates of transition to schizophrenia | | |
| Class of substance | Number of studies | Estimate | Lower bound | Upper bound |
|---|---|---|---|---|
| Brief, atypical and NOS | 34 | 36% | 30% | 43% |
| Combined | - | 25% | 18% | 38% |
| Cannabis | 6 | 34% | 25% | 46% |
| Hallucinogens | 3 | 26% | 14% | 43% |
| Amphetamines | 5 | 22% | 14% | 34% |
| Opioids | 3 | 12% | 8% | 18% |
| Sedatives | 3 | 10% | 7% | 15% |
| Alcohol | 9 | 9% | 6% | 15% |

== Substances ==
Psychotic states may occur after using a variety of legal and illegal substances. Substances whose use or withdrawal is implicated in psychosis include the following. Psychoactive substance-induced psychotic disorders are outlined within the ICD-10 codes F10.5—F19.5.

=== Alcohol ===
F10.5 alcohol: Alcohol is a common cause of psychotic disorders or episodes, which may occur through acute intoxication, chronic alcoholism, withdrawal, exacerbation of existing disorders, or acute idiosyncratic reactions. Research has shown that excessive alcohol use causes an 8-fold increased risk of psychotic disorders in men and a 3 fold increased risk of psychotic disorders in women. While the vast majority of cases are acute and resolve fairly quickly upon treatment and/or abstinence, they can occasionally become chronic and persistent. Alcoholic psychosis is sometimes misdiagnosed as another mental illness such as schizophrenia.

=== Opioids ===
F11.5 opioids: Studies show stronger opioids such as fentanyl are more likely to cause psychotic symptoms, such as hallucinations.

=== Cannabinoids ===
F12.5 cannabinoids: Studies indicate that cannabis may trigger full-blown psychosis, as seen in cannabis-induced psychotic disorder. Studies have found an increase in risk for psychosis in cannabis users.

=== Sedatives/hypnotics ===
F13.5 sedatives/hypnotics (barbiturates; benzodiazepines): It is also important to this topic to understand the paradoxical effects of some sedative drugs. Serious complications can occur in conjunction with the use of sedatives creating the opposite effect as to that intended. Malcolm Lader at the Institute of Psychiatry in London estimates the incidence of these adverse reactions at about 5%, even in short-term use of the drugs. The paradoxical reactions may consist of depression, with or without suicidal tendencies, phobias, aggressiveness, violent behavior and symptoms sometimes misdiagnosed as psychosis. However, psychosis is more commonly related to the benzodiazepine withdrawal syndrome.

=== Cocaine ===
F14.5 cocaine.

=== Stimulants ===
F15.5 other stimulants: amphetamines, methamphetamine, and methylphenidate, among others.

=== Hallucinogens ===
F16.5 hallucinogens: Hallucinogen-induced psychotic disorder (HIPD) can be caused by hallucinogens such as dissociatives, cannabinoids, and psychedelics. Studies show that 0.002% to 0.6% of users may experience psychotic reactions to psychedelics specifically. Symptoms can last for weeks or months without treatment, and may transition to schizophrenia.

=== Volatile solvents ===
F18.5 volatile solvents (volatile inhalants);

- Toluene, found in glue, paint, thinner, etc..
- Butane
- Gasoline (petrol)
- Nitrous oxide (N_{2}O)

=== Dissociative drugs ===
Dissociative drug-induced psychotic disorder is listed as code 6C4D.5 in ICD-11. Dissociative drugs include ketamine and phencyclidine (PCP). Ketamine and phencyclidine (PCP) are strongly linked to psychosis.

=== MDMA ===
MDMA-induced psychotic disorder is listed as code 6C4C.6 in ICD-11.

=== Tobacco ===
F17.5 is reserved for tobacco-induced psychosis, but is traditionally not associated with the induction of psychosis.

=== Caffeine ===
The code F15.5 also includes caffeine-induced psychosis, despite not being specifically listed in the DSM-IV. However, there is evidence that caffeine, in extreme acute doses or when taken in excess for long periods of time, may induce psychosis.

=== Medication ===
- Over-the-counter drugs, including:
  - Dextromethorphan (DXM) at high doses.
  - Certain antihistamines at high doses.
  - Cold medications (i.e., containing phenylpropanolamine, or PPA)
- Anticholinergic drugs
  - Atropine
  - Scopolamine
- Anticonvulsants
- Antidepressants
- Antimalarials
  - Mepacrine
- Antipsychotics, in an idiosyncratic or paradoxical reaction
- Fluoroquinolone drugs: Fluoroquinolone use has been linked to serious cases of toxic psychosis. The related quinoline derivative mefloquine (Lariam) has also been associated with psychosis.
- Isotretinoin
- L-DOPA and dopamine agonists
- Prednisone and other corticosteroids

=== Other drugs illicit in America ===
Other drugs illegal in America (not listed above), including:

- Synthetic cathinones, such as mephedrone and related amphetamine-like drugs sold as "bath salts" or "plant food".
- Synthetic research chemicals used recreationally, including JWH-018 and other synthetic cannabinoids, or mixtures containing them (e.g. "Spice", "Kronic", "MNG" or "Mr. Nice Guy", "Relaxinol", etc.). Various "JWH-..." compounds in "Spice" or "Incense" have also been found and have been found to cause psychosis in some people.

=== Plants ===
Psychoactive plants, including:

- Ayahuasca (Banisteriopsis caapi and Psychotria viridis)
- Belladonna (deadly nightshade)
- Datura (Jimsonweed, devil's trumpet, thorn apple)
- Hypericum perforatum (St. John's wort)
- Morning glory seeds (e.g., Ipomoea tricolor, Ipomoea corymbosa, Argyreia nervosa) (contain ergine, others)
- Salvia divinorum

=== Nonmedicinal substances ===
Substances chiefly nonmedicinal as to source:

- Acetone and other ketones (T52.4);
- Antifreeze – a mixture of ethylene glycol and other glycols (T51.8);
- Aniline (T65.3);
- Arsenic and its compounds (T57.0).
- Carbon monoxide (T58), carbon dioxide (T59.7), carbon disulfide (T65.4);
- Heavy metals;
- Organophosphate insecticides (T60.0);
- Sarin and other nerve gases;
- Tetraethyllead (T56.0);

== See also ==
- Cannabis-induced psychotic disorder (CIPD)
- Hallucinogen-induced psychotic disorder (HIPD)
- Stimulant psychosis
- Substance intoxication
- Substance use disorder
