= CIPD =

CIPD may refer to:

- Cannabis-induced psychotic disorder, a psychotic disorder caused by cannabis
- Chartered Institute of Personnel and Development, an association for human resource management professionals
