= HIPD =

HIPD may refer to:

- Hallucinogen-induced psychotic disorder, a psychotic disorder caused by hallucinogenic drug use
- Hawaii Department of Public Safety, an American law enforcement agency
