= Open Dialogue =

Alternative approach for treating psychosis

Open Dialogue is an alternative approach for treating psychosis as well as other mental health disorders developed in the 1980s in Finland by Yrjö Alanen and his collaborators. Open Dialogue interventions are currently being trialed in several other countries including Australia, Belgium, Denmark, Germany, Italy, Norway, Poland, the United Kingdom, and the United States.

Open Dialogue (OD) developed from Need-Adapted Treatment as described by Alanen and colleagues in the early 1990s. This approach took shape within the mental health services of Finnish Western Lapland in the 1980s and 1990s. During its initial research and training in psychotherapy, seven key principles were identified:

1. providing immediate help
2. considering clients' social network during the treatment
3. being flexible and mobile during the treatment
4. assigning the responsibility of organizing treatments to one professional
5. ensuring psychological continuity
6. accepting uncertainty
7. engaging in dialogism

The first five principles focus on the organizational aspects of delivering mental health services; the last two principles are about the conversational methods mental health professionals use in network meetings with clients. The participation of friends and family, responding to the client's utterances, trying to make meaning of what a client has to say, and "tolerating uncertainty".

A recently published global survey on the worldwide implementation of Open Dialogue in mental health services gathered data from 142 Open Dialogue teams in 24 countries, mainly in Europe. Key factors enhancing Open Dialogue implementation included well-trained staff, regular supervisions, research capabilities, diverse professional teams, self-referrals, outpatient services, younger clients, and the involvement of experts by experience. The study underscores the importance of more Open Dialogue training, supervision, and research.

A variant of the approach, known as Peer-supported Open Dialogue (POD), incorporates peer workers with lived experience of mental health difficulties into the Open Dialogue model. POD retains the network-based and dialogical principles of Open Dialogue while explicitly incorporating peer support into the delivery of care. Open Dialogue has also been described as both a therapeutic approach and a system for organising and providing mental health services.

A practical account of the approach was published in 2019 by British psychiatrist Russell Razzaque in Dialogical Psychiatry: A Handbook for the Teaching and Practice of Open Dialogue. The book describes Open Dialogue as both a way of organising mental health services and a form of therapeutic practice, outlining the organisational changes required to provide continuity and network-based care alongside the dialogical methods used in network meetings. It provides an overview of the principles and practice of Open Dialogue for clinicians, peer workers and others involved in mental health services.

== Theoretical basis ==
In a paper illustrating the Open Dialogue method Seikkula, Alakar and Aaltonen postulate that "from the social constructionist point of view, psychosis can be seen as one way of dealing with terrifying experience in one's life that do not have language other than the one of hallucinations and delusions" and that "psychotic reactions should be seen [as] attempts to make sense of one's experiences that are so heavy that they have made it impossible to construct a rational spoken narrative" arguing that people may talk about such experiences in metaphor.

They offer a model that "psychotic reactions greatly resemble traumatic experiences" with experiences of victimization "not being stored in the part of the memory system that promotes sense-making". Postulating that "an Open Dialogue, without any preplanned themes or forms seems to be important in enabling the construction of a new language in which to express difficult events in one's life."

This understanding differs radically from common psychiatric models of psychosis that view it as being caused by a biological process in the brain, such as the dopamine hypothesis of schizophrenia.

== Effectiveness ==
Although pilot treatments since the 1980s show improved reintegration and a reduction in the need for medication, a systematic review of academic publications on the topic in 2018 concluded that "further studies are needed in a real-world setting to explore how and why [Open Dialogue] works", remarking that "most studies were highly biased and of low quality".

"Open Dialogue for Psychosis: Organising Mental Health Services to Prioritise Dialogue, Relationship and Meaning", edited by Putman and Martindale was published in 2021. It includes chapters on long term randomised, controlled research projects currently underway in the UK, Italy and Denmark to establish an evidence base for Open Dialogue in those national health services, funded by grants from the NIH in the UK and the Ministry of Health in Italy. In the UK, five NHS trusts are involved with a common training regime for both clinic and peer worker participant staff and have enrolled participant service users. In Italy, eight regional mental health services are involved in that trial.

In Denmark, a trial was conducted across five municipalities, and in 2019, Buus et al. published a retrospective register study, where they compared the level of contact with emergency and general practice services by young people who had been assisted by Open Dialogue services compared with those assisted by treatment-as-usual services in Denmark, and found that in the first year those in the Open Dialogue cohort had more contacts but in the following years fewer, concluding that "Open Dialogue was significantly associated with some reduced risks of utilising health care services. These mixed results should be tested in a randomized design."

In Italy, a prospective cohort study published in 2024 evaluated the implementation of Open Dialogue in eight regional mental health departments across the country. Over a 12-month period, 58 patients participated in 517 OD-network meetings, which included family and social network members. The study found statistically significant improvements in patients' psychological well-being, social functioning, and perceived quality of life. Specifically, outcome measures such as the Global Assessment of Functioning (GAF), the Clinical Outcomes in Routine Evaluation (CORE-OM), and the Lubben Social Network Scale (LSNS) all showed positive trends over time. Session and outcome rating scales also demonstrated high levels of satisfaction and therapeutic alliance among both patients and their networks. These results suggest that the Open Dialogue approach is feasible and effective within Italy's community-based mental health system, supporting its potential scalability and alignment with national mental health reforms inspired by the legacy of Franco Basaglia.

In 2026, The ODDESSI Trial (Open Dialogue: Development and Evaluation of a Social Network Intervention for Severe Mental Illness) reported findings from a multisite cluster-randomised study comparing Peer-supported Open Dialogue with treatment as usual among 494 adults presenting in crisis to mental health services in England. Participants were followed for two years.

Open Dialogue was associated with substantially lower use of acute mental health services. Participants receiving Open Dialogue had more than three times greater odds of avoiding psychiatric hospital admission (OR 3.30, 95% CI 2.18–5.22). In the observed data, 21% of Open Dialogue participants experienced psychiatric inpatient care during follow-up compared with 44% receiving treatment as usual. The odds of re-referral to crisis care or external secondary mental health services were also less than half those seen with treatment as usual (OR 0.44, 95% CI 0.30–0.64).

Patient-reported outcomes also favoured Open Dialogue. At 24 months, participants receiving Open Dialogue reported significantly better general health and patient-defined recovery. Satisfaction with the care received was also significantly higher. There was no statistically significant difference between Open Dialogue and treatment as usual in time to relapse following recovery, although at 24 months the estimated proportion who had not relapsed was 54% with Open Dialogue compared with 49% with treatment as usual.

Overall, the trial found that while relapse occurred at broadly similar rates, people receiving Open Dialogue were substantially less likely to require hospital or crisis services and reported better recovery, general health and experience of care.
