= Psychosis =

Abnormal condition of the mind

- Other names: Psychotic break (colloquial), psychotic episode
- Specialty: Neurology, psychiatry, emergency medicine, clinical psychology
- Symptoms: Delusions, hallucinations, incoherent speech and behavior
- Complications: Self-harm, suicide
- Causes: Mental illness (schizophrenia, bipolar disorder), trauma, sleep deprivation, some medical conditions, certain medications, drugs (including alcohol, caffeine and cannabis)
- Treatment: Antipsychotics, counselling, social support
- Prognosis: Depends on cause
- Frequency: 3% of people at some point in their lives (U.S.)

In psychopathology, psychosis (/saɪˈkoʊsɪs/) is the inability to distinguish what is or is not real. Examples of psychotic symptoms are delusions, hallucinations, and disorganized or incoherent thoughts or speech. Psychosis is a description of a person's state or symptoms, rather than a specific mental illness, and it is not related to the personality construct of psychopathy.

Common causes of chronic psychosis include schizophrenia or schizoaffective disorder, bipolar disorder, and brain damage (usually as a result of alcoholism). Acute psychosis can also be caused by severe distress, sleep deprivation, sensory deprivation, some medications, and drug use and withdrawal (including alcohol, cannabis, hallucinogens, and stimulants). Acute psychosis is termed primary if it results from a psychiatric condition and secondary if it is caused by another medical condition or drugs. The diagnosis of a mental-health condition requires excluding other potential causes. Tests can be administered to check whether psychosis is caused by central nervous system diseases, toxins, or other health problems.

Treatment may include antipsychotic medication, psychotherapy, and social support. Early treatment appears to improve outcomes. Medications appear to have a moderate effect. Outcomes depend on the underlying cause.

Psychosis is not well-understood at the neurological level, but dopamine (along with other neurotransmitters) is known to play an important role. In the United States about 3% of people develop psychosis at some point in their lives. A condition similar to psychosis was described as early as the 4th century BCE by Hippocrates and possibly as early as 1500 BCE in the Ebers Papyrus.

== Signs and symptoms ==
=== Hallucinations ===
A hallucination is defined as a sensory perception in the absence of external stimuli. Hallucinations are different from illusions and perceptual distortions, which are the misperception of external stimuli. Hallucinations may occur in any of the senses and take on almost any form. They may consist of simple sensations (such as lights, colors, sounds, tastes, or smells) or more detailed experiences (such as seeing and interacting with animals and people, hearing voices, and having complex tactile sensations). Hallucinations are generally characterized as being vivid and uncontrollable. Auditory hallucinations, particularly experiences of hearing voices, is a common and often prominent feature of psychosis.

Up to 15% of the general population may experience auditory hallucinations (though not all are due to psychosis). The prevalence of auditory hallucinations in patients with schizophrenia is generally put around 70%. Reported prevalence in bipolar disorder ranges between 11% and 68%. During the early 20th century, auditory hallucinations were second to visual hallucinations in frequency, but they are now the most common manifestation of schizophrenia, although rates vary between cultures and regions. Auditory hallucinations are most commonly intelligible voices. When voices are present, the average number has been estimated at three. Content, like frequency, differs significantly, especially across cultures and demographics. People who experience auditory hallucinations can frequently identify the loudness, location of origin, and may settle on identities for voices. Western cultures are associated with auditory experiences concerning religious content, frequently related to sin. Hallucinations may command a person to do something potentially dangerous when combined with delusions.

So-called "minor hallucinations", such as extracampine hallucinations, or false perceptions of people or movement occurring outside of one's visual field, frequently occur in neurocognitive disorders, such as Parkinson's disease.

Visual hallucinations occur in roughly a third of people with schizophrenia, although certain studies show rates higher than 60%, suggesting that the prevalence of visual hallucinations may be higher in certain samples than traditionally thought. The reported prevalence in bipolar disorder is around 15%. Content commonly involves animate objects, although perceptual abnormalities such as changes in lighting, shading, streaks, or lines may be seen. Visual abnormalities may conflict with proprioceptive information, and visions may include experiences such as the ground tilting. Lilliputian hallucinations are less common in schizophrenia, and are more common in various types of encephalopathy, such as peduncular hallucinosis.

A visceral hallucination, also called a cenesthetic hallucination, is characterized by visceral sensations in the absence of stimuli. Cenesthetic hallucinations may include sensations of burning, or re-arrangement of internal organs.

=== Delusions ===
A delusion is a fixed, false, idiosyncratic belief, which does not change even when presented with incontrovertible evidence to the contrary. Delusions are context- and culture-dependent: a belief that inhibits critical functioning and is widely considered delusional in one population may be common (and even adaptive) in another, or in the same population at a later time. Since normative views may contradict available evidence, a belief need not contravene cultural standards in order to be considered delusional. However, the DSM-5 considers a belief delusional only if it is not widely accepted within a cultural or subcultural context.

Prevalence of delusions in schizophrenia is generally considered around 80-90%, according to Columbia University. A 2022 systematic review found a prevalence of around 70% in bipolar disorder.

The DSM-5 characterizes certain delusions as "bizarre" if they are clearly implausible, or are incompatible with the surrounding cultural context. The concept of bizarre delusions has many criticisms, the most prominent being that judging their presence is not highly reliable even among trained individuals.

A delusion may involve diverse thematic content. The most common type is a persecutory delusion, in which a person believes that an entity seeks to harm them. Others include delusions of reference (the belief that some element of one's experience represents a deliberate and specific act by or message from some other entity), delusions of grandeur (the belief that one possesses special power or influence beyond one's actual limits), thought broadcasting (the belief that one's thoughts are audible) and thought insertion (the belief that one's thoughts are not one's own). A delusion may also involve misidentification of objects, persons, or environs that the afflicted should reasonably be able to recognize; such examples include Cotard's syndrome (the belief that oneself is partly or wholly dead) and clinical lycanthropy (the belief that oneself is or has transformed into an animal).

The subject matter of delusions seems to reflect the current culture in a particular time and location. For example, in the early 1900s in the United States, syphilis was a common theme in delusions. During the Second World War, it was Germany. In the Cold War era, communists became a frequent focus. Now, in recent years, technology is a common subject matter of delusions. Some psychologists, such as those who practice the Open Dialogue method, believe that the content of psychosis represents an underlying thought process partially or primarily responsible for psychosis, but the accepted medical position is that psychosis is caused by neurological brain dysfunction.

Historically, Karl Jaspers classified psychotic delusions into primary and secondary types. Primary delusions are defined as arising suddenly and not being comprehensible in terms of normal mental processes, whereas secondary delusions are typically understood as being influenced by the person's background or current situation (e.g., ethnicity, religious, superstitious, or political beliefs).

=== Disorganized speech/thought and disorganized behavior ===
Disorganization is categorized into either disorganized speech (disorganized speech stemming from disorganized thought), and grossly disorganized motor behavior. Disorganized speech or thought, also formally called thought disorder, is disorganization of thinking that is inferred from speech. Characteristics of disorganized speech include rapidly switching topics which is called derailment or loose association, switching to topics that are unrelated which is called tangential thinking, incomprehensible speech which is called incoherence and referred to as a word salad. Disorganized motor behavior includes repetitive, odd, or sometimes purposeless movement. Disorganized motor behavior rarely includes catatonia, and although it was a prominent symptom historically, it is rarely seen today. Whether this may be due to the use of historical treatments or the lack thereof is unknown.

Catatonia describes a profoundly agitated state in which the experience of reality is generally considered impaired. There are two primary manifestations of catatonic behavior. The classic presentation is a person who does not move or interact with the world in any way while awake. This type of catatonia presents with waxy flexibility. Waxy flexibility is when someone physically moves part of a catatonic person's body and the person stays in the position even if it is bizarre and otherwise nonfunctional (such as moving a person's arm straight up in the air and the arm staying there).

The other type of catatonia is more of an outward presentation of the profoundly agitated state described above. It involves excessive and purposeless motor behaviour, as well as an extreme mental preoccupation that prevents an intact experience of reality. An example is someone walking very fast in circles to the exclusion of anything else with a level of mental preoccupation (meaning not focused on anything relevant to the situation) that was not typical of the person prior to the symptom onset. In both types of catatonia, there is generally no reaction to anything that happens outside of them. It is important to distinguish catatonic agitation from severe bipolar mania, although someone could have both.

=== Negative symptoms ===
Negative symptoms include reduced emotional expression, decreased motivation (avolition), and reduced spontaneous speech (poverty of speech, alogia). Individuals with this condition lack interest and spontaneity, and have the inability to feel pleasure (anhedonia). Altered Behavioral Inhibition System functioning could possibly cause reduced sustained attention in psychosis and overall contribute to more negative reactions.

=== Psychosis in adolescents ===
Psychosis is relatively rare in adolescents but not uncommon. Young people who have psychosis may have trouble connecting with the world around them and may experience hallucinations or delusions. Adolescents with psychosis may also have cognitive deficits that may make it harder for the youth to socialize and work. Potential impairments include a reduced speed of mental processing, the lack of ability to focus without getting distracted (limited attention span), and deficits in verbal memory. If an adolescent is experiencing psychosis, they most likely have comorbidity, meaning that they could have multiple mental illnesses. Because of this, it may be difficult to determine whether it is psychosis or autism, social or generalized anxiety disorder, or obsessive–compulsive disorder.

== Causes ==
The symptoms of psychosis may be caused by serious psychiatric disorders such as schizophrenia, a number of medical illnesses, and trauma. Psychosis may also be temporary or transient, and be caused by medications or substance use disorder (substance-induced psychosis).

=== Normal states ===
Brief hallucinations are not uncommon in those without any psychiatric disease, including healthy children. Causes or triggers include:

- Falling asleep and waking: hypnagogic and hypnopompic hallucinations
- Bereavement, in which hallucinations of a deceased loved one are common
- Severe sleep deprivation
- Extreme stress (see below)
- Abnormal brainwaves
- Abnormal brain networks
- Traumatic brain injury

=== Trauma and stress ===
Traumatic life events have been linked with an elevated risk of developing psychotic symptoms. Childhood trauma has specifically been shown to be a predictor of adolescent and adult psychosis. Individuals with psychotic symptoms are three times more likely to have experienced childhood trauma (e.g., physical or sexual abuse, physical or emotional neglect) than those in the general population. Increased individual vulnerability toward psychosis may interact with traumatic experiences promoting an onset of future psychotic symptoms, particularly during sensitive developmental periods. Importantly, the relationship between traumatic life events and psychotic symptoms appears to be dose-dependent in which multiple traumatic life events accumulate, compounding symptom expression and severity.

However, acute, stressful events can also trigger brief psychotic episodes. Trauma prevention and early intervention may be an important target for decreasing the incidence of psychotic disorders and ameliorating its effects. A healthy person could become psychotic when inside an empty room with no light and sound. After about 15 minutes, psychosis can occur, this is a phenomenon known as sensory deprivation.

Neuroticism, a personality trait associated with vulnerability to stressors, is an independent predictor of the development of psychosis.

=== Psychiatric disorders ===
Traditionally psychotic disorders have been believed to have one of two roots: organic (physiological) or functional (mental). Organic disorders being those caused by physical conditions directly affecting the brain with psychosis as a secondary feature, and functional disorders being primary psychological or psychiatric disorders (disorders of the functioning of the mind) in the absence of physiological causes. Subtle physical abnormalities have been found in illnesses traditionally considered functional, such as schizophrenia. The DSM-IV-TR avoids the functional/organic distinction, and instead lists traditional psychotic illnesses, psychosis due to general medical conditions, and substance-induced psychosis.

Primary psychiatric causes of psychosis include the following:

- Primary psychotic disorders
  - Schizophrenia
  - Schizoaffective disorder
  - Schizophreniform disorder
  - Brief psychotic disorder
  - Delusional disorder
- Mood disorders
  - Psychotic depression, also known as major depressive disorder with psychotic features
  - Bipolar disorder
    - Bipolar I disorder in manic and mixed episodes, as well as depressive episodes
    - Bipolar II disorder in depressive episodes

Psychotic symptoms may also be seen in:

- Certain personality disorders
  - Schizotypal personality disorder
  - Paranoid personality disorder
  - Borderline personality disorder
  - Narcissistic personality disorder
- Post-traumatic stress disorder
- Dissociative identity disorder
- Obsessive–compulsive disorder
- Body dysmorphic disorder
- Panic disorder
- Paraphrenia
- Oneirophrenia

==== Subtypes ====
Subtypes of psychosis include:

- Postpartum psychosis, occurring shortly after giving birth, primarily associated with maternal bipolar disorder
- Monothematic delusions
- Myxedematous psychosis
- Stimulant psychosis
- Tardive psychosis
- Shared psychosis

==== Cycloid psychosis ====
Cycloid psychosis is typically an acute, self-limiting form of psychosis with psychotic and mood symptoms that progress from normal to full-blown, usually between a few hours to days, and not related to drug intake or brain injury. While proposed as a distinct entity, clinically separate from schizophrenia and affective disorders, cycloid psychosis is not formally acknowledged by current ICD or DSM criteria. Its unclear place in psychiatric nosology has likely contributed to the limited scientific investigation and literature on the topic.

==== Postpartum psychosis ====
Postpartum psychosis is a rare yet serious and debilitating form of psychosis. Symptoms range from fluctuating moods and insomnia to mood-incongruent delusions related to the individual or the infant. Women experiencing postpartum psychosis are at increased risk for suicide or infanticide. Many women who experience first-time psychosis from postpartum often have bipolar disorder, meaning they could experience an increase of psychotic episodes even after postpartum.

=== Medical conditions ===
A very large number of medical conditions can cause psychosis, sometimes called secondary psychosis. Examples include:

- Disorders causing delirium (toxic psychosis), in which consciousness is disturbed
- Neurodevelopmental disorders and chromosomal abnormalities, including velocardiofacial syndrome
- Neurodegenerative disorders, such as Alzheimer's disease, dementia with Lewy bodies, and Parkinson's disease
- Focal neurological disease, such as stroke, brain tumors, multiple sclerosis, and some forms of epilepsy
- Malignancy (typically via masses in the brain, paraneoplastic syndromes)
- Infectious and postinfectious syndromes, including infections causing delirium, viral encephalitis, HIV/AIDS, malaria, syphilis
- Endocrine disease, such as hypothyroidism, hyperthyroidism, Cushing's syndrome, hypoparathyroidism and hyperparathyroidism; sex hormones also affect psychotic symptoms and sometimes giving birth can provoke psychosis, termed postpartum psychosis
- Inborn errors of metabolism, such as Wilson's disease, porphyria, and homocysteinemia
- Nutritional deficiency, such as vitamin B_{12} deficiency
- Other acquired metabolic disorders, including electrolyte disturbances such as hypocalcemia, hypernatremia, hyponatremia, hypokalemia, hypomagnesemia, hypermagnesemia, hypercalcemia, and hypophosphatemia, but also hypoglycemia, hypoxia, and failure of the liver or kidneys
- Autoimmune and related disorders , such as systemic lupus erythematosus (lupus, SLE), sarcoidosis, Hashimoto's encephalopathy, anti-NMDA-receptor encephalitis, and non-celiac gluten sensitivity
- Poisoning by a range of plants, fungi, metals, organic compounds, and a few animal toxins
- Sleep disorders, such as in narcolepsy (in which REM sleep intrudes into wakefulness)
- Parasitic diseases, such as neurocysticercosis

=== Psychoactive drugs ===
Various psychoactive substances (both legal and illegal) have been implicated in causing, exacerbating, or precipitating psychotic states or disorders in users, with varying levels of evidence. This may be upon intoxication for a more prolonged period after use, or upon withdrawal. Individuals who experience substance-induced psychosis tend to have a greater awareness of their psychosis and tend to have higher levels of suicidal thinking compared to those who have a primary psychotic illness. Drugs commonly alleged to induce psychotic symptoms include alcohol, cannabis, cocaine, amphetamines, cathinones, psychedelic drugs (such as LSD and psilocybin), κ-opioid receptor agonists (such as enadoline and salvinorin A) and NMDA receptor antagonists (such as phencyclidine and ketamine). Caffeine may worsen symptoms in those with schizophrenia and cause psychosis at very high doses in people without the condition. Cannabis and other illicit recreational drugs are often associated with psychosis in adolescents and cannabis use before 15 years old may increase the risk of psychosis in adulthood.

==== Alcohol ====
Approximately 3% of people with alcoholism experience psychosis during acute intoxication or withdrawal. Alcohol related psychosis may manifest itself through a kindling mechanism. The mechanism of alcohol-related psychosis is due to the long-term effects of alcohol consumption resulting in distortions to neuronal membranes, gene expression, as well as thiamine deficiency. It is possible that hazardous alcohol use via a kindling mechanism can cause the development of a chronic substance-induced psychotic disorder, i.e. schizophrenia. The effects of an alcohol-related psychosis include an increased risk of depression and suicide as well as causing psychosocial impairments. Delirium tremens, a symptom of chronic alcoholism that can appear in the acute withdrawal phase, shares many symptoms with alcohol-related psychosis suggesting a common mechanism.

==== Cannabis ====
According to current studies, cannabis use is associated with increased risk of psychotic disorders, including cannabis-induced psychotic disorder, and the more often cannabis is used the more likely a person is to develop a psychotic illness. Furthermore, people with a history of cannabis use develop psychotic symptoms earlier than those who have never used cannabis. Some debate exists regarding the causal relationship between cannabis use and psychosis with some studies suggesting that cannabis use hastens the onset of psychosis primarily in those with pre-existing vulnerability. Indeed, cannabis use plays an important role in the development of psychosis in vulnerable individuals, and cannabis use in adolescence should be discouraged. Some studies indicate that the effects of two active compounds in cannabis, tetrahydrocannabinol (THC) and cannabidiol (CBD), have opposite effects with respect to psychosis. While THC can induce psychotic symptoms in healthy individuals, limited evidence suggests that CBD may have antipsychotic effects.

==== Methamphetamine ====
Methamphetamine induces a psychosis in 26%–46% of heavy users. Some of these people develop a long-lasting psychosis that can persist for longer than six months. Those who have had a short-lived psychosis from methamphetamine can have a relapse of the methamphetamine psychosis years later after a stressful event such as severe insomnia or a period of hazardous alcohol use despite not relapsing back to methamphetamine. Individuals who have a long history of methamphetamine use and who have experienced psychosis in the past from methamphetamine use are highly likely to re-experience methamphetamine psychosis if drug use is recommenced. Methamphetamine-induced psychosis is likely gated by genetic vulnerability, which can produce long-term changes in brain neurochemistry following repetitive use. Methamphetamine users with more ADHD-related behaviours in childhood experience methamphetamine-related psychosis more frequently.

==== Psychedelics ====
A 2024 meta-analysis found an incidence of psychedelic-induced psychosis at 0.002% in population studies, 0.2% in uncontrolled clinical trials, and 0.6% in randomised controlled trials. This meta-analysis found that in uncontrolled clinical trials involving only patients with schizophrenia, 3.8% developed prolonged psychotic reactions. A 2024 study found that psychedelic use was not generally associated with a change in the number of psychotic symptoms. This study found that psychedelic use interacted with a family history of bipolar disorder, such that in those with a family history of bipolar disorder, psychedelic use was associated with an increase in the number of psychotic symptoms, while in those with a personal history of psychosis but no family history of psychotic disorders, psychedelic use was associated with a decrease in the number of psychotic symptoms. A 2023 study found an interaction between lifetime psychedelic use and family history of psychosis or bipolar disorder on psychotic symptoms over the past two weeks. Psychotic symptoms were highest among those with both a family history of psychosis or bipolar disorder and life-time psychedelic use, while they were lowest among those with life-time psychedelic use but no family history of these disorders.

=== Medication ===
Administration, or sometimes withdrawal, of a large number of medications may provoke psychotic symptoms. Drugs that can induce psychosis experimentally or in a significant proportion of people include:

- Stimulants, such as amphetamine and other sympathomimetics
- Dopamine agonists
- Ketamine
- Corticosteroids (often with mood changes in addition)
- Some anticonvulsants such as vigabatrin

== Pathophysiology ==
=== Neuroimaging ===
The first brain image of an individual with psychosis was completed as far back as 1935 using a technique called pneumoencephalography (a painful and now obsolete procedure where cerebrospinal fluid is drained from around the brain and replaced with air to allow the structure of the brain to show up more clearly on an X-ray picture).

Both first episode psychosis, and high risk status is associated with reductions in grey matter volume (GMV). First episode psychotic and high risk populations are associated with similar but distinct abnormalities in GMV. Reductions in the right middle temporal gyrus, right superior temporal gyrus (STG), right parahippocampus, right hippocampus, right middle frontal gyrus, and left anterior cingulate cortex (ACC) are observed in high risk populations. Reductions in first episode psychosis span a region from the right STG to the right insula, left insula, and cerebellum, and are more severe in the right ACC, right STG, insula and cerebellum.

Another meta analysis reported bilateral reductions in insula, operculum, STG, medial frontal cortex, and ACC, but also reported increased GMV in the right lingual gyrus and left precentral gyrus. The Kraepelinian dichotomy is made questionable by grey matter abnormalities in bipolar and schizophrenia; schizophrenia is distinguishable from bipolar in that regions of grey matter reduction are generally larger in magnitude, although adjusting for gender differences reduces the difference to the left dorsomedial prefrontal cortex (dmPFC), and right dorsolateral prefrontal cortex (dlPFC).

During attentional tasks, first episode psychosis is associated with hypoactivation in the right middle frontal gyrus, a region generally described as encompassing the dlPFC. Altered Behavioral Inhibition System functioning could possibly cause reduced sustained attention in psychosis and overall contribute to more negative reactions. In congruence with studies on grey matter volume, hypoactivity in the right insula, and right inferior parietal lobe is also reported. During cognitive tasks, hypoactivities in the right insula, dorsal anterior cingulate cortex, and the left precuneus, as well as reduced deactivations in the right basal ganglia, right thalamus, right inferior frontal gyrus and left precentral gyrus are observed. These results are highly consistent and replicable possibly except the abnormalities of the right inferior frontal gyrus. Decreased grey matter volume in conjunction with bilateral hypoactivity is observed in anterior insula, dorsal medial frontal cortex, and dorsal anterior cingulate cortex. Decreased grey matter volume and bilateral hyperactivity is reported in posterior insula, ventral medial frontal cortex, and ventral anterior cingulate cortex.

Recent research also shown that the volume of the pituitary gland, which play a central role in the hypothalamic-pituitary-adrenal (HPA) axis, is not a stable characteristic in people with psychosis, but is associated with the severity of psychotic symptoms.

=== Hallucinations ===
Studies during acute experiences of hallucinations demonstrate increased activity in primary or secondary sensory cortices. As auditory hallucinations are most common in psychosis, most robust evidence exists for increased activity in the left middle temporal gyrus, left superior temporal gyrus, and left inferior frontal gyrus (i.e. Broca's area). Activity in the ventral striatum, hippocampus, and ACC are related to the lucidity of hallucinations, and indicate that activation or involvement of emotional circuitry are key to the impact of abnormal activity in sensory cortices. Together, these findings indicate abnormal processing of internally generated sensory experiences, coupled with abnormal emotional processing, results in hallucinations. One proposed model involves a failure of feedforward networks from sensory cortices to the inferior frontal cortex, which normally cancel out sensory cortex activity during internally generated speech. The resulting disruption in expected and perceived speech is thought to produce lucid hallucinatory experiences.

=== Delusions ===
The two-factor model of delusions posits that dysfunction in both belief formation systems and belief evaluation systems are necessary for delusions. Dysfunction in evaluations systems localized to the right lateral prefrontal cortex, regardless of delusion content, is supported by neuroimaging studies and is congruent with its role in conflict monitoring in healthy persons. Abnormal activation and reduced volume is seen in people with delusions, as well as in disorders associated with delusions such as frontotemporal dementia, psychosis and Lewy body dementia. Furthermore, lesions to this region are associated with "jumping to conclusions", damage to this region is associated with post-stroke delusions, and hypometabolism this region associated with caudate strokes presenting with delusions.

The aberrant salience model suggests that delusions are a result of people assigning excessive importance to irrelevant stimuli. In support of this hypothesis, regions normally associated with the salience network demonstrate reduced grey matter in people with delusions, and the neurotransmitter dopamine, which is widely implicated in salience processing, is also widely implicated in psychotic disorders.

Specific regions have been associated with specific types of delusions. The volume of the hippocampus and parahippocampus is related to paranoid delusions in Alzheimer's disease, and has been reported to be abnormal post mortem in one person with delusions. Capgras delusions have been associated with occipito-temporal damage, and may be related to failure to elicit normal emotions or memories in response to faces.

=== Negative symptoms ===
Psychosis is associated with the ventral striatum (VS), which is the part of the brain that is involved with the desire to naturally satisfy the body's needs. When high reports of negative symptoms were recorded, there were significant irregularities in the left VS. Anhedonia, defined as the inability to feel joy or pleasure, is a commonly reported symptom in psychosis; experiences with the condition are present in most people with schizophrenia. Previous research has indicated that a deficiency in the neural representation in regards to goals and the motivation to achieve them, has demonstrated that when a reward is not present, a strong reaction is noted in the ventral striatum; reinforcement learning is intact when contingencies about stimulus-reward are implicit, but not when they require explicit neural processing; reward prediction errors are what the actual reward is versus what the reward was predicted to be. In most cases positive prediction errors are considered an abnormal occurrence. A positive prediction error response occurs when there is an increased activation in a brain region, typically the striatum, in response to unexpected rewards. A negative prediction error response occurs when there is a decreased activation in a region when predicted rewards do not occur. The anterior cingulate cortex (ACC) response, taken as an indicator of effort allocation, does not increase with reward or reward probability increase, and is associated with negative symptoms; deficits in dorsolateral prefrontal cortex (dlPFC) activity and failure to improve performance on cognitive tasks when offered monetary incentives are present; and dopamine mediated functions are abnormal.

=== Neurobiology ===
Psychosis has been traditionally linked to the overactivity of the neurotransmitter dopamine, in particular to its effect in the mesolimbic pathway, spanning from the ventral tegmental area to the ventral striatum. Additionally, recent evidence suggests a crucial involvement of the pathway spanning from the substantia nigra to the dorsal striatum. The two major sources of evidence given to support this theory are that dopamine receptor D_{2} blocking drugs (i.e., antipsychotics) tend to reduce the intensity of psychotic symptoms, and that drugs that accentuate dopamine release, or inhibit its reuptake (such as amphetamines and cocaine) can trigger psychosis in some people (see stimulant psychosis). However, there is substantial evidence that dopaminergic overactivity does not fully explain psychosis, and that neurodegerative pathophysiology plays a significant role. This is evidenced by the fact that psychosis commonly occurs in neurodegenerative diseases of the dopaminergic nervous system, such as Parkinson's disease, which involved reduced, rather than increased, dopaminergic activity.

The endocannabinoid system is also implicated in psychosis. This is evidenced by the propensity of CB_{1} receptor agonists such as THC to induce psychotic symptoms, and the efficacy of CB_{1} receptor antagonists such as CBD in ameliorating psychosis.

NMDA receptor dysfunction has been proposed as a mechanism in psychosis. This theory is reinforced by the fact that dissociative NMDA receptor antagonists such as ketamine, PCP and dextromethorphan (at large overdoses) induce a psychotic state. The symptoms of dissociative intoxication are also considered to mirror the symptoms of schizophrenia, including negative symptoms. NMDA receptor antagonism, in addition to producing symptoms reminiscent of psychosis, mimics the neurophysiological aspects, such as reduction in the amplitude of P50, P300, and MMN evoked potentials. Hierarchical Bayesian neurocomputational models of sensory feedback, in agreement with neuroimaging literature, link NMDA receptor hypofunction to delusional or hallucinatory symptoms via proposing a failure of NMDA mediated top down predictions to adequately cancel out enhanced bottom up AMPA mediated predictions errors. Excessive prediction errors in response to stimuli that would normally not produce such a response is thought to root from conferring excessive salience to otherwise mundane events. Dysfunction higher up in the hierarchy, where representation is more abstract, could result in delusions. The common finding of reduced GAD67 expression in psychotic disorders may explain enhanced AMPA mediated signaling, caused by reduced GABAergic inhibition.

The connection between dopamine and psychosis is generally believed to be complex. While dopamine receptor D_{2} suppresses adenylate cyclase activity, the D_{1} receptor increases it. If D_{2}-blocking drugs are administered, the blocked dopamine spills over to the D_{1} receptors. The increased adenylate cyclase activity affects genetic expression in the nerve cell, which takes time. Hence antipsychotic drugs take a week or two to reduce the symptoms of psychosis. Moreover, newer and equally effective antipsychotic drugs actually block slightly less dopamine in the brain than older drugs whilst also blocking 5-HT_{2A} receptors, suggesting the 'dopamine hypothesis' may be oversimplified. Soyka and colleagues found no evidence of dopaminergic dysfunction in people with alcohol-induced psychosis and Zoldan et al. reported moderately successful use of ondansetron, a 5-HT_{3} receptor antagonist, in the treatment of levodopa psychosis in Parkinson's disease patients.

A review found an association between a first-episode of psychosis and prediabetes.

Prolonged or high dose use of psychostimulants can alter normal functioning, making it similar to the manic phase of bipolar disorder. NMDA antagonists replicate some of the so-called "negative" symptoms like thought disorder in subanesthetic doses (doses insufficient to induce anesthesia), and catatonia in high doses. Psychostimulants, especially in one already prone to psychotic thinking, can cause some "positive" symptoms, such as delusional beliefs, particularly those persecutory in nature.

=== Culture ===
Cross-cultural studies into schizophrenia have found that individual experiences of psychosis and 'hearing voices' vary across cultures. In countries such as the United States where there exists a predominantly biomedical understanding of the body, the mind and in turn, mental health, subjects were found to report their hallucinations as having 'violent content' and self-describing as 'crazy'. This experience is at odds with the experiences of subjects in Accra, Ghana, who describe the voices they hear as having 'spiritual meaning' and are often reported as positive in nature; or subjects in Chennai, India, who describe their hallucinations as kin, family members or close friends, and offering guidance.

These differences are attributed to 'social kindling' or how one's social context shapes the way they interpret and experience sensations such as hallucinations. This concept aligns with preexisting cognitive theory such as reality modelling and is supported by recent research that demonstrates that individuals with psychosis can be taught to attend to their hallucinations differently, which in turn alters the hallucinations themselves. Such research creates pathways for social or community-based treatment, such as reality monitoring, for individuals with schizophrenia and other psychotic disorders, providing alternatives to, or supplementing traditional pharmacologic management.

Cross-cultural studies explore the way in which psychosis varies in different cultures, countries and religions. The cultural differences are based on the individual or shared illness narratives surrounding cultural meanings of illness experience. In countries such as India, Cambodia and Muslim majority countries, they each share alternative epistemologies. These are known as knowledge systems that focus on the connections between mind, body, culture, nature and society. Cultural perceptions of mental disorders such as psychosis or schizophrenia are believed to be caused by jinn (spirits) in Muslim majority countries. Furthermore, those in Arab-Muslim societies perceive those who act differently than the social norm as "crazy" or as abnormal behaviour. This differs from the experiences of individuals in India and how they attain their perspectives on mental health issues through a variety of spiritual and healing traditions. In Cambodia, hallucinations are linked with spirit visitation, a term they call "cultural kindling". These examples of differences are attributed to culture and the way it shapes conceptions of mental disorders. These cultural differences can be useful in bridging the gap of cultural understanding and psychiatric signs and symptoms.

== Diagnosis ==
To make a diagnosis of a mental illness in someone with psychosis other potential causes must be excluded. An initial assessment includes a comprehensive history and physical examination by a health care provider. Tests may be done to exclude substance use, medication, toxins, surgical complications, or other medical illnesses.

Delirium should be ruled out, which can be distinguished by visual hallucinations, acute onset and fluctuating level of consciousness, indicating other underlying factors, including medical illnesses. Excluding medical illnesses associated with psychosis is performed by using blood tests to measure:

- Thyroid-stimulating hormone to exclude hypo- or hyperthyroidism
- Vitamin B_{12} serum and urinary MMA to rule out pernicious anemia or vitamin B_{12} deficiency
- Basic electrolytes and serum calcium to rule out a metabolic disturbance
- Full blood count including ESR to rule out a systemic infection or chronic disease
- Serology to exclude syphilis or HIV infection.

Other investigations include:

- EEG to exclude epilepsy
- MRI or CT scan of the head to exclude brain lesions

Because psychosis may be precipitated or exacerbated by common classes of medications, medication-induced psychosis should be ruled out, particularly for first-episode psychosis. Both substance- and medication-induced psychosis can be excluded to a high level of certainty, using toxicology screening.

Because some dietary supplements may also induce psychosis or mania, but cannot be ruled out with laboratory tests, a psychotic individual's family, partner, or friends should be asked whether the patient is currently taking any dietary supplements.

Common mistakes made when diagnosing people who are psychotic include:

- Not properly excluding delirium
- Not appreciating medical abnormalities (e.g., vital signs)
- Not obtaining a medical history and family history
- Indiscriminate screening without an organizing framework
- Missing a toxic psychosis by not screening for substances and medications
- Not asking their families or others about dietary supplements
- Premature diagnostic closure
- Not revisiting or questioning the initial diagnostic impression of primary psychiatric disorder

Only after relevant and known causes of psychosis are excluded, a mental health clinician may make a psychiatric differential diagnosis using a person's family history, incorporating information from the person with psychosis, and information from family, friends or romantic partners.

Types of psychosis in psychiatric disorders may be established by formal rating scales. The Brief Psychiatric Rating Scale (BPRS) assesses the level of 18 symptom constructs of psychosis such as hostility, suspicion, hallucination, and grandiosity. It is based on the clinician's interview with the patient and observations of the patient's behavior over the previous 2–3 days. The patient's family can also answer questions on the behavior report. During the initial assessment and the follow-up, both positive and negative symptoms of psychosis can be assessed using the 30 item Positive and Negative Syndrome Scale (PANSS).

The DSM-5 characterizes disorders as psychotic or on the schizophrenia spectrum if they involve hallucinations, delusions, disorganized thinking, grossly disorganized motor behavior, or negative symptoms. The DSM-5 does not include psychosis as a definition in the glossary, although it defines "psychotic features", as well as "psychoticism" with respect to personality disorder. The ICD-10 has no specific definition of psychosis.

The Psychosis Screening Questionnaire (PSQ) is the most common tool in detecting psychotic symptoms and it includes five root questions that assess the presence of PLE (mania, thought insertion, paranoia, strange experiences and perceptual disturbances) The different tools used to assess symptom severity include the Revised Behavior and Symptom Identification Scale (BASIS-R), a 24-item self-report instrument with six scales: psychosis, depression/functioning, interpersonal problems, alcohol/drug use, self-harm, and emotional lability. The Symptom Checklist-90-Revised (SCL-90-R), a 90-item self assessment tool that measures psychoticism and paranoid ideation in addition to seven other symptom scales. Finally, the Brief Symptom Inventory (BSI), a 53-item self-administered scale developed from the SCL-90-R. The BSI has good psychometric properties and is an acceptable brief alternative to the SCL-90-R. These seem to be the most accurate tools at the moment, but a research in 2007 that focused on quantifying self-reports of auditory verbal hallucinations (AVH) in persons with psychosis, suggest that The Hamilton Program for Schizophrenia Voices Questionnaire (HPSVQ) is also potentially a reliable and useful measure for specifically quantifying AVHs in relation to psychosis.

Factor analysis of symptoms generally regarded as psychosis frequently yields a five factor solution, albeit five factors that are distinct from the five domains defined by the DSM-5 to encompass psychotic or schizophrenia spectrum disorders. The five factors are frequently labeled as hallucinations, delusions, disorganization, excitement, and emotional distress. The DSM-5 emphasizes a psychotic spectrum, wherein the low end is characterized by schizoid personality disorder, and the high end is characterized by schizophrenia.

Gouzoulis-Mayfrank et al. said that the pleasant or emotionally positive experiences that are common in psychosis, particularly in the early stages, are more easily overlooked in clinical practice than the negative experiences. Nev Jones and Mona Shattel wrote that there is less curiosity towards the complications, or towards the richness of the good things as well as the bad things.

== Prevention ==
The evidence for the effectiveness of early interventions to prevent psychosis appeared inconclusive. But psychosis caused by drugs can be prevented. Whilst early intervention in those with a psychotic episode might improve short-term outcomes, little benefit was seen from these measures after five years. However, there is evidence that cognitive behavioral therapy (CBT) may reduce the risk of becoming psychotic in those at high risk, and in 2014 the U.K. National Institute for Health and Care Excellence (NICE) recommended preventive CBT for people at risk of psychosis.

== Treatment ==
The treatment of psychosis depends on the specific diagnosis (such as schizophrenia, bipolar disorder or substance intoxication). The first-line treatment for many psychotic disorders is antipsychotic medication, which can reduce the positive symptoms of psychosis in about 7 to 14 days. For youth or adolescents, treatment options include medications, psychological interventions, and social interventions.

=== Medication ===
The choice of which antipsychotic to use is based on benefits, risks, and costs. It is debatable whether, as a class, typical or atypical antipsychotics are better. Tentative evidence supports that amisulpride, olanzapine, risperidone and clozapine may be more effective for positive symptoms but result in more side effects. Typical antipsychotics have equal drop-out and symptom relapse rates to atypicals when used at low to moderate dosages. There is a good response in 40–50%, a partial response in 30–40%, and treatment resistance (failure of symptoms to respond satisfactorily after six weeks to two or three different antipsychotics) in 20% of people. Clozapine is an effective treatment for those who respond poorly to other drugs ("treatment-resistant" or "refractory" schizophrenia), but it has the potentially serious side effect of agranulocytosis (lowered white blood cell count) in less than 4% of people.

Most people on antipsychotics get side effects. People on typical antipsychotics tend to have a higher rate of extrapyramidal side effects while some atypicals are associated with considerable weight gain, diabetes and risk of metabolic syndrome; this is most pronounced with olanzapine, while risperidone and quetiapine are also associated with weight gain. Risperidone has a similar rate of extrapyramidal symptoms to haloperidol.

=== Psychotherapy ===
Psychological treatments such as acceptance and commitment therapy (ACT) are possibly useful in the treatment of psychosis, helping people to focus more on what they can do in terms of valued life directions despite challenging symptomology. Metacognitive training (MCT) is associated with reduced delusions, hallucinations and negative symptoms as well as improved self-esteem and functioning in individuals with schizophrenia spectrum disorders.

There are many psychosocial interventions that seek to treat the symptoms of psychosis: need adapted treatment, Open Dialogue, psychoanalysis/psychodynamic psychotherapy, major role therapy, soteria, psychosocial outpatient and inpatient treatment, milieu therapy, and cognitive behavioral therapy (CBT). In relation to the success of CBT for psychosis, a randomized controlled trial for a web-based Cognitive Behavioral Therapy for Psychosis (CBT-P) skills program named Coping With Voices (CWV) suggest that the program has promise for increasing access to CBT-P It also associated benefits in the management of distressing psychotic symptoms and improved social functioning. When CBT and the other psychosocial interventions these are used without antipsychotic medications, they may be somewhat effective for some people, especially for CBT, need-adapted treatment, and soteria. Research also suggests that mindfulness-based interventions may reduce psychotic symptoms in people with psychosis while improving psychosocial functioning.

=== Early intervention ===
Early intervention in psychosis is based on the observation that identifying and treating someone in the early stages of a psychosis can improve their longer-term outcome. This approach advocates the use of an intensive multi-disciplinary approach during what is known as the critical period, where intervention is the most effective, and prevents the long-term morbidity associated with chronic psychotic illness.

== History ==
=== Etymology ===
The word psychosis was introduced to the psychiatric literature in 1841 by Karl Friedrich Canstatt in his work Handbuch der Medizinischen Klinik. He used it as a shorthand for 'psychic neurosis'. At that time neurosis meant any disease of the nervous system, and Canstatt was thus referring to what was considered a psychological manifestation of brain disease. Ernst von Feuchtersleben is also widely credited as introducing the term in 1845, as an alternative to insanity and mania.

The term stems from Modern Latin psychosis, "a giving soul or life to, animating, quickening" and that from Ancient Greek ψυχή (psyche), "soul" and the suffix -ωσις (-osis), in this case "abnormal condition".

In its adjective form "psychotic", references to psychosis can be found in both clinical and non-clinical discussions. However, in a non-clinical context, "psychotic" is a nonspecific colloquialism used to mean "insane".

=== Classification ===
The word was also used to distinguish a condition considered a disorder of the mind, as opposed to neurosis, which was considered a disorder of the nervous system. The psychoses thus became the modern equivalent of the old notion of madness, and hence there was much debate on whether there was only one (unitary) or many forms of the new disease. One type of broad usage would later be narrowed down by Koch in 1891 to the 'psychopathic inferiorities'—later renamed abnormal personalities by Schneider.

The division of the major psychoses into manic depressive illness (now called bipolar disorder) and dementia praecox (now called schizophrenia) was made by Emil Kraepelin, who attempted to create a synthesis of the various mental disorders identified by 19th-century psychiatrists, by grouping diseases together based on classification of common symptoms. Kraepelin used the term 'manic depressive insanity' to describe the whole spectrum of mood disorders, in a far wider sense than it is usually used today.

In Kraepelin's classification this would include 'unipolar' clinical depression, as well as bipolar disorder and other mood disorders such as cyclothymia. These are characterised by problems with mood control and the psychotic episodes appear associated with disturbances in mood, and patients often have periods of normal functioning between psychotic episodes even without medication. Schizophrenia is characterized by psychotic episodes that appear unrelated to disturbances in mood, and most non-medicated patients show signs of disturbance between psychotic episodes.

=== Treatment ===
Written record of supernatural causes and resultant treatments can be traced back to the New Testament. Mark 5:8–13 describes a man displaying what would today be described as psychotic symptoms. Christ cured this "demonic madness" by casting out the demons and hurling them into a herd of swine. Exorcism is still utilized in some religious circles as a treatment for psychosis presumed to be demonic possession. A research study of out-patients in psychiatric clinics found that 30% of religious patients attributed the cause of their psychotic symptoms to evil spirits. Many of these patients underwent exorcistic healing rituals that, though largely regarded as positive experiences by the patients, had no effect on symptomology. Results did however show a significant worsening of psychotic symptoms associated with exclusion of medical treatment for coercive forms of exorcism.

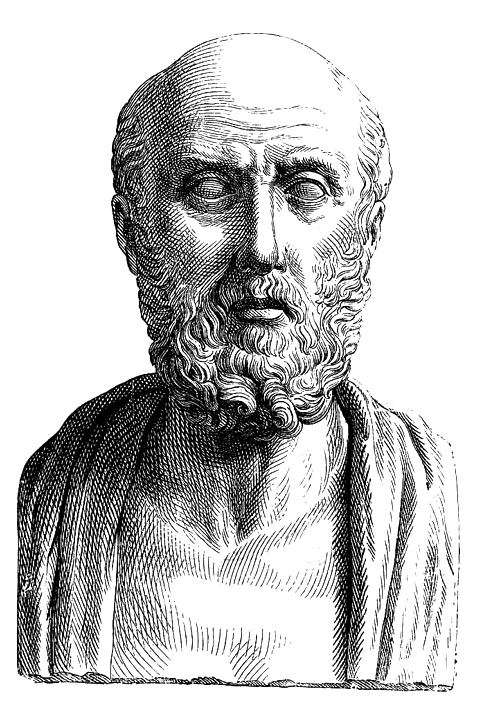
Bust of Hippocrates

The medical teachings of the fourth-century philosopher and physician Hippocrates of Cos proposed a natural, rather than supernatural, cause of human illness. In Hippocrates' work, the Hippocratic corpus, a holistic explanation for health and disease was developed to include madness and other "diseases of the mind". Hippocrates writes:

Men ought to know that from the brain, and from the brain only, arise our pleasures, joys, laughter, and jests, as well as our sorrows, pains, griefs and tears. Through it, in particular, we think, see, hear, and distinguish the ugly from the beautiful, the bad from the good, the pleasant from the unpleasant.... It is the same thing which makes us mad or delirious, inspires us with dread and fear, whether by night or by day, brings sleeplessness, inopportune mistakes, aimless anxieties, absentmindedness, and acts that are contrary to habit.

Hippocrates espoused a theory of humoralism wherein disease is resultant of a shifting balance in bodily fluids including blood, phlegm, black bile, and yellow bile. According to humoralism, each fluid or "humour" has temperamental or behavioral correlates. In the case of psychosis, symptoms are thought to be caused by an excess of both blood and yellow bile. Thus, the proposed surgical intervention for psychotic or manic behavior was bloodletting.

18th-century physician, educator, and widely considered "founder of American psychiatry", Benjamin Rush, also prescribed bloodletting as a first-line treatment for psychosis. Although not a proponent of humoralism, Rush believed that active purging and bloodletting were efficacious corrections for disruptions in the circulatory system, a complication he believed was the primary cause of "insanity". Although Rush's treatment modalities are now considered antiquated and brutish, his contributions to psychiatry, namely the biological underpinnings of psychiatric phenomenon including psychosis, have been invaluable to the field. In honor of such contributions, Benjamin Rush's image was used in the official seal of the American Psychiatric Association from 1922 to 2015.

Early 20th-century treatments for severe and persisting psychosis were characterized by an emphasis on shocking the nervous system. Such therapies include insulin shock therapy, cardiazol shock therapy, and electroconvulsive therapy. Despite considerable risk, shock therapy was considered highly efficacious in the treatment of psychosis including schizophrenia. The acceptance of high-risk treatments led to more invasive medical interventions including psychosurgery.

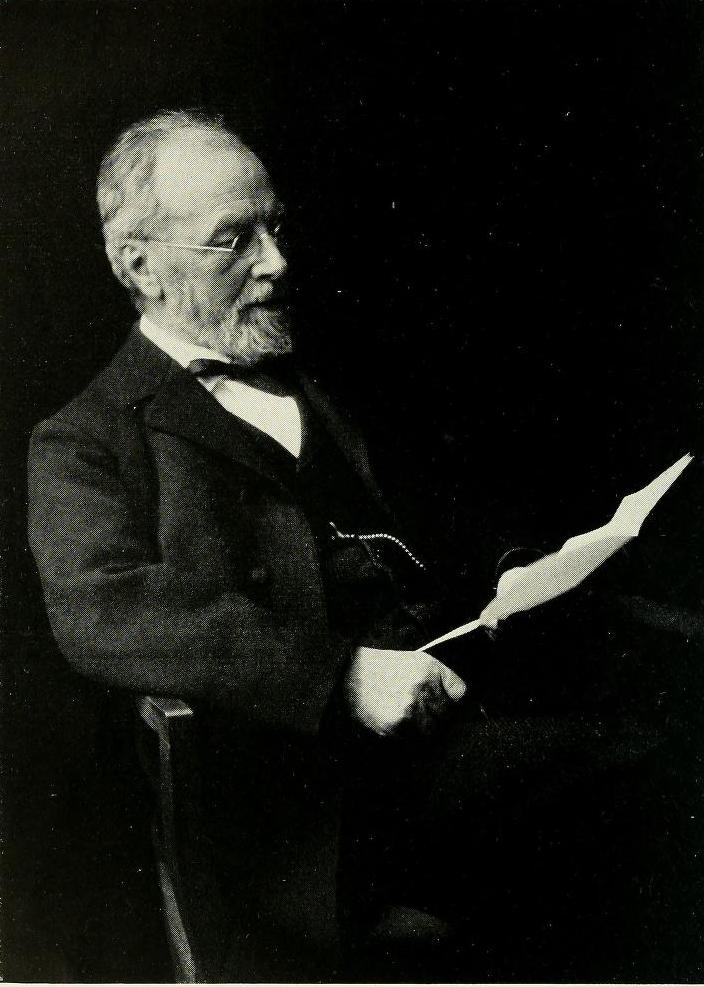
Gottlieb Burckhardt (1836–1907)

In 1888, Swiss psychiatrist Gottlieb Burckhardt performed the first medically sanctioned psychosurgery in which the cerebral cortex was excised. Although some patients showed improvement of symptoms and became more subdued, one patient died and several developed aphasia or seizure disorders. Burckhardt would go on to publish his clinical outcomes in a scholarly paper. This procedure was met with criticism from the medical community and his academic and surgical endeavors were largely ignored. In the late 1930s, Egas Moniz conceived the leucotomy (AKA prefrontal lobotomy) in which the fibers connecting the frontal lobes to the rest of the brain were severed. Moniz's primary inspiration stemmed from a demonstration by neuroscientists John Fulton and Carlyle's 1935 experiment in which two chimpanzees were given leucotomies and pre- and post-surgical behavior was compared. Prior to the leucotomy, the chimps engaged in typical behavior including throwing feces and fighting. After the procedure, both chimps were pacified and less violent. During the Q&A, Moniz asked if such a procedure could be extended to human subjects, a question that Fulton admitted was quite startling. Moniz would go on to extend the controversial practice to humans with various psychotic disorders, an endeavor for which he received a Nobel Prize in 1949. Between the late 1930s and early 1970s, the leucotomy was a widely accepted practice, often performed in non-sterile environments such as small outpatient clinics and patient homes. Psychosurgery remained standard practice until the discovery of antipsychotic pharmacology in the 1950s.

The first clinical trial of antipsychotics (also commonly known as neuroleptics) for the treatment of psychosis took place in 1952. Chlorpromazine (brand name: Thorazine) passed clinical trials and became the first antipsychotic medication approved for the treatment of both acute and chronic psychosis. Although the mechanism of action was not discovered until 1963, the administration of chlorpromazine marked the advent of the dopamine antagonist, or first generation antipsychotic. While clinical trials showed a high response rate for both acute psychosis and disorders with psychotic features, the side effects were particularly harsh, which included high rates of often irreversible Parkinsonian symptoms such as tardive dyskinesia. With the advent of atypical antipsychotics (also known as second generation antipsychotics) came a dopamine antagonist with a comparable response rate but a far different, though still extensive, side-effect profile that included a lower risk of Parkinsonian symptoms but a higher risk of cardiovascular disease. Atypical antipsychotics remain the first-line treatment for psychosis associated with various psychiatric and neurological disorders including schizophrenia, bipolar disorder, major depressive disorder, anxiety disorders, dementia, and some autism spectrum disorders.

Dopamine is now one of the primary neurotransmitters implicated in psychotic symptomology. Blocking dopamine receptors (namely, the dopamine D2 receptors) and decreasing dopaminergic activity continues to be an effective but highly unrefined effect of antipsychotics, which are commonly used to treat psychosis. Recent pharmacological research suggests that the decrease in dopaminergic activity does not eradicate psychotic delusions or hallucinations, but rather attenuates the reward mechanisms involved in the development of delusional thinking; that is, connecting or finding meaningful relationships between unrelated stimuli or ideas. The author of this research paper acknowledges the importance of future investigation:

The model presented here is based on incomplete knowledge related to dopamine, schizophrenia, and antipsychotics—and as such will need to evolve as more is known about these.

— Shitij Kapur, From dopamine to salience to psychosis—linking biology, pharmacology and phenomenology of psychosis

Freud's former student Wilhelm Reich explored independent insights into the physical effects of neurotic and traumatic upbringing, and published his holistic psychoanalytic treatment with a schizophrenic. With his incorporation of breathwork and insight with the patient, a young woman, she achieved sufficient self-management skills to end the therapy.

Lacan extended Freud's ideas to create a psychoanalytic model of psychosis based upon the concept of "foreclosure", the rejection of the symbolic concept of the father.

Psychiatrist David Healy has criticised pharmaceutical companies for promoting simplified biological theories of mental illness that seem to imply the primacy of pharmaceutical treatments while ignoring social and developmental factors that are known important influences in the etiology of psychosis.

== Society and culture ==
Symptoms of psychosis can also include visions or quasi-visual experiences, felt presences, alterations of time, alterations of space, or alterations of spatiotemporal qualities of objects and things. While there are many overwhelmingly negative experiences of psychosis, some experiences of psychosis can be overwhelmingly positive and can be experienced as uplifting or as healing or as difficult but meaningful. Jones and Shattell said that mutual dialogue in clinical practice would in theory allow the meaning and complexity of psychotic experiences to emerge.

=== Disability ===
The classification of psychosis as a social disability is a common occurrence.

Psychosis is considered to be among the top ten causes of social disability among adults in developed countries. The traditional, negative narrative around disability has been shown to adversely influence employment and education for people experiencing psychosis.

Social disability by way of social disconnection is a significant public health concern and is associated with a broad range of negative outcomes, including premature mortality. Social disconnection refers to the ongoing absence of family or social relationships with marginal participation in social activities.

Research on psychosis found that reduced participation in social networks, not only negatively effects the individual on a physical and mental level, it has been shown that failure to be included in social networks influences the individual's ability to participate in the wider community through employment and education opportunities.

== Research ==
Further research in the form of randomized controlled trials is needed to determine the effectiveness of treatment approaches for helping adolescents with psychosis. Through 10 randomized clinical trials, studies showed that Early Intervention Services (EIS) for patients with early-phase schizophrenia spectrum disorders have generated promising outcomes. EIS are specifically intended to fulfill the needs of patients with early-phase psychosis. In addition, one meta-analysis that consisted of four randomized clinical trials has examined and discovered the efficacy of EIS to Therapy as Usual (TAU) for early-phase psychosis, revealing that EIS techniques are superior to TAU.

A study suggests that combining cognitive behavioral therapy (CBT) with SlowMo, an application that helps notice their "unhelpful quick-thinking", might be more effective for treating paranoia in people with psychosis than CBT alone.

== Bibliography ==
- Badcock JC, Paulik G, eds. (2019). A Clinical Introduction to Psychosis: Foundations for Clinical Psychologists and Neuropsychologists (1st ed.). Cambridge, Massachusetts: Academic Press, imprint of Elsevier. doi:10.1016/C2017-0-01829-3. ISBN 978-0-12-815012-2. S2CID 243510002.
- Lewandowski KE, Moustafa A, eds. (2019). Social Cognition in Psychosis (1st ed.). Cambridge, Massachusetts: Academic Press, imprint of Elsevier. doi:10.1016/C2017-0-03061-6. ISBN 978-0-12-815315-4. S2CID 239126550.
- Semple D, Smyth R (2019). "Schizophrenia and related psychoses". In Semple D, Smyth R (eds.). Oxford Handbook of Psychiatry (4th ed.). Oxford: Oxford University Press. pp. 179–240. doi:10.1093/med/9780198795551.003.0005. ISBN 978-0-19-879555-1.
- Tamminga CA, van Os J, Reininghaus U, Ivleva E, eds. (2020). Psychotic Disorders: Comprehensive Conceptualization and Treatments (1st ed.). Oxford: Oxford University Press. doi:10.1093/med/9780190653279.001.0001. ISBN 978-0-19-065327-9.
- Thompson AD, Broome MR, eds. (2020). Risk Factors for Psychosis: Paradigms, Mechanisms, and Prevention (1st ed.). Cambridge, Massachusetts: Academic Press, imprint of Elsevier. doi:10.1016/B978-0-12-813201-2.00001-6. ISBN 978-0-12-813201-2. S2CID 213499429.
