= Hallucinogen-induced psychotic disorder =

Psychotic disorder caused by hallucinogenic drug use

- Other names: HIPD, hallucinogen-induced psychosis, psychedelic-induced psychosis
- Specialty: Psychiatry, addiction psychiatry
- Symptoms: Hallucinations, delusions, paranoia, insomnia
- Complications: Self-harm, suicide
- Causes: Hallucinogens, including psychedelics
- Risk factors: Pre-existing psychosis or schizophrenia, personal or family history of mental illness
- Treatment: Atypical antipsychotics
- Frequency: 0.002–0.6% in different studies

Hallucinogen-induced psychotic disorder (HIPD), also known as hallucinogen-induced psychosis or psychedelic-induced psychosis, is a mental disorder characterized by psychotic symptoms such as hallucinations, delusions, severe paranoia, disorganized thinking and behavior, and insomnia. Hallucinogen-induced psychotic disorder occurs following the use of hallucinogens, for instance psychedelics like LSD, psilocybin, or dimethyltryptamine (DMT).

The incidence rate of HIPD with psychedelics is 0.002% to 0.6% in different types of studies and is considered to be low and rare. HIPD with psychedelics is more likely to occur in individuals with a personal or family history of mental illness and is far more likely to occur in people with schizophrenia.

The treatment is atypical antipsychotic medication. Hallucinogen-induced psychotic disorder may last for weeks or months if left untreated.

== Signs and symptoms ==
The symptoms of hallucinogen-induced psychotic disorder involve the symptoms of psychosis such as severe paranoia, confusion, agitation, hallucinations, delusions, disorganized thinking, and disorganized behavior. Memory problems and insomnia may also occur. The symptoms typically begin shortly after using a hallucinogen and continue until they are treated with an antipsychotic medication. The symptoms of hallucinogen-induced psychotic disorder are similar to those of schizophrenia and it may have a similar underlying genetic vulnerability. The typical duration of psychedelic-induced psychosis, including with pharmacological treatment, is 1.8 weeks (~13 days). Rarely, psychedelic-related psychosis has been associated with homicide.

== Causes ==
LSD is a known cause of hallucinogen-induced psychotic disorder. It is the most common psychedelic in emergency department visits, being responsible for 47.3% of all cases of psychedelic-induced psychosis.

Psilocybin can cause hallucinogen-induced psychotic disorder after brief or intermittent use. There are several case studies of psilocybin-induced psychosis. A 25-year-old woman was treated with olanzapine for hallucinogen-induced psychotic disorder caused by psilocybin. A 30-year-old man was also successfully treated with olanzapine for hallucinogen-induced psychotic disorder caused by psilocybin. In emergency departments, psilocybin is responsible for 18.8% of all cases of psychedelic-induced psychosis.

There are case reports of mescaline causing hallucinogen-induced psychotic disorder. In one case, a 41-year-old man was successfully treated with first risperidone, then aripiprazole for HIPD caused by mescaline.

Dimethyltryptamine (DMT) is known to cause hallucinogen-induced psychotic disorder. There are case reports of DMT-induced psychosis. In one case, a 42-year-old man was successfully treated with quetiapine for hallucinogen-induced psychotic disorder caused by DMT. In another case, a 25-year-old male was successfully treated with paliperidone for hallucinogen-induced psychotic disorder caused by DMT. In emergency departments, DMT is responsible for 3.2% of all cases of hallucinogen-induced psychotic disorder.

Psychedelics are not thought to cause de novo psychosis but instead to exacerbate or unmask it in people with pre-existing psychotic susceptibility.

== Diagnosis ==
Hallucinogen-induced psychotic disorder has the code 6C49.5 in the ICD-11.

=== Differential diagnosis ===
Hallucinogen persisting perception disorder (HPPD) involves lasting visual changes after use of a hallucinogenic drug. Hallucinogen persisting perception disorder is not a psychotic disorder. It is a long-term visual condition most often found among frequent hallucinogenic drug users.

== Treatment ==
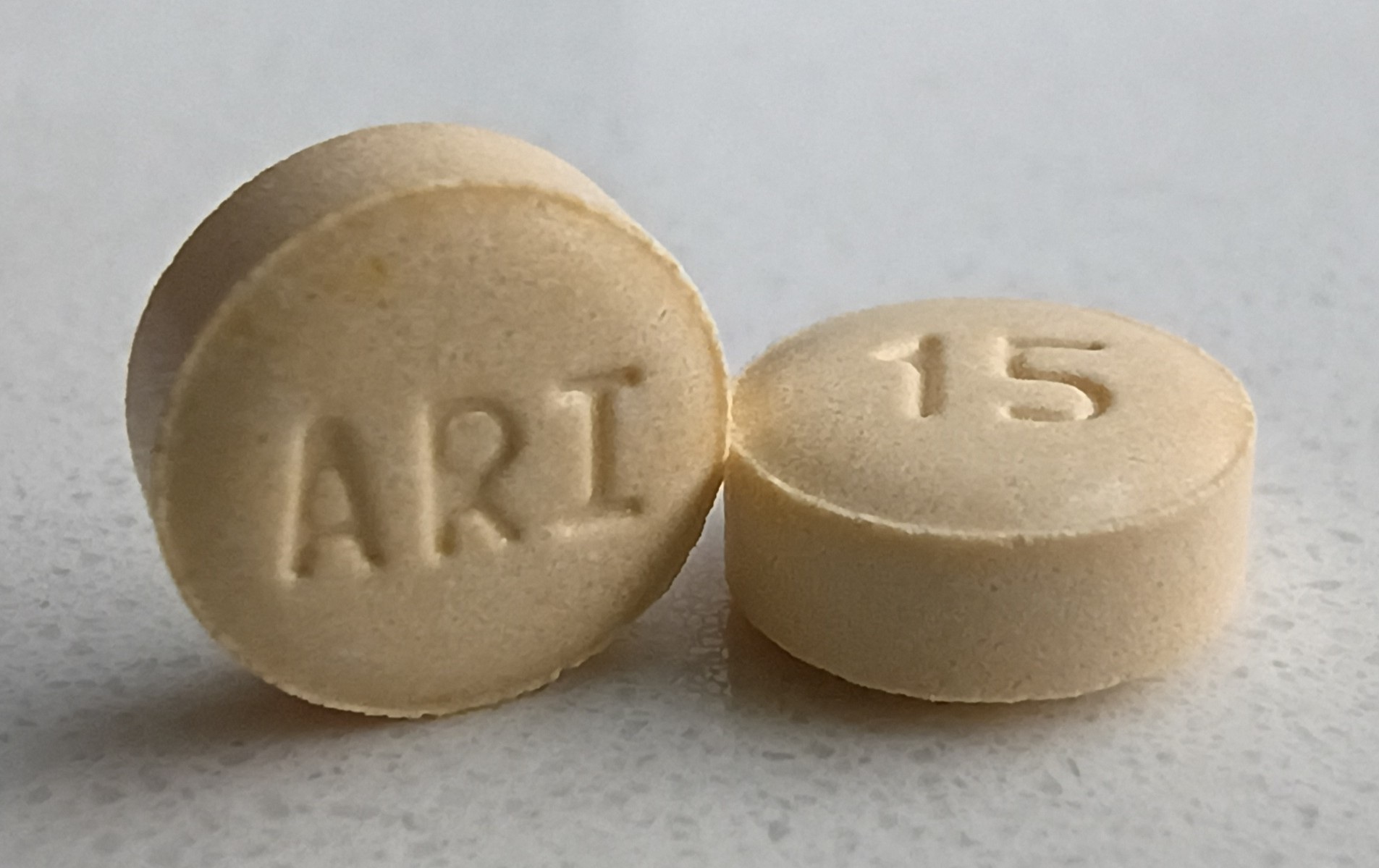
Aripiprazole 15 mg is used to treat hallucinogen-induced psychotic disorder.

Treatment consists of atypical antipsychotics such as risperidone, olanzapine, aripiprazole, or quetiapine. Haloperidol, a typical antipsychotic may be given in the emergency room to stabilize a patient before they are switched to an atypical antipsychotic for maintenance therapy. If the hallucinogen is still active in an individual's system, risperidone is recommended directly as a first-line hallucinogen antidote, or trip killer. Aripiprazole, brexpiprazole, cariprazine, and lurasidone are third-generation antipsychotics used to treat substance-induced psychosis. Compared to second and first-generation antipsychotics, third-generation antipsychotics have a better side effect profile and improved tolerability for long-term use. Individuals are also recommended to practice abstinence from hallucinogens and can be given counseling designed to assist with preventing a relapse of substance use.

== Prognosis ==
Hallucinogen-induced psychotic disorder is later diagnosed as schizophrenia in approximately 13 to 26% of individuals. A rate of transition to schizophrenia of 13% has been found with psychedelics in a 2025 study and a rate of 26% with hallucinogens including psychedelics and phencyclidine (PCP) in an 2020 study. The rate of transition to schizophrenia with psychedelics is lower than with amphetamines (22%) and cannabis (34%).

Left untreated, hallucinogen-induced psychotic disorder has sometimes led to suicide. Patients usually have an individual or family psychiatric history.

== Epidemiology ==
Psychedelic-induced psychosis has been reported to occur at rates of 0.002% of individuals in population studies, 0.2% in uncontrolled trials, and 0.6% in randomized controlled trials, with an overall rate of 0.4%. Excluding people with psychiatric disorders caused the overall rate to drop to 0.2%. In uncontrolled trials of people with schizophrenia, the rate was 3.8%, albeit based on low-quality data from the 1950s and 1960s. The risk of psychedelic-induced psychosis is considered to be low and rare for the general population when people with pre-existing schizophrenia or psychosis are excluded. In addition, it is far lower than with cannabis and psychostimulants, which have reported rates of 30 to 55%. It is also thought to be lower than with dissociatives like phencyclidine (PCP). The quality of existing findings on incidence of psychedelic-induced psychosis is low as of 2025. Little to no data exist for some types of hallucinogens such as Salvia divinorum.

== See also ==
- Cannabis-induced psychotic disorder (CIPD)
- Psychedelic syndrome
- Schizophrenia
- Substance-induced psychosis (SIP)
