= Caffeine-induced psychosis =

Mental disorder

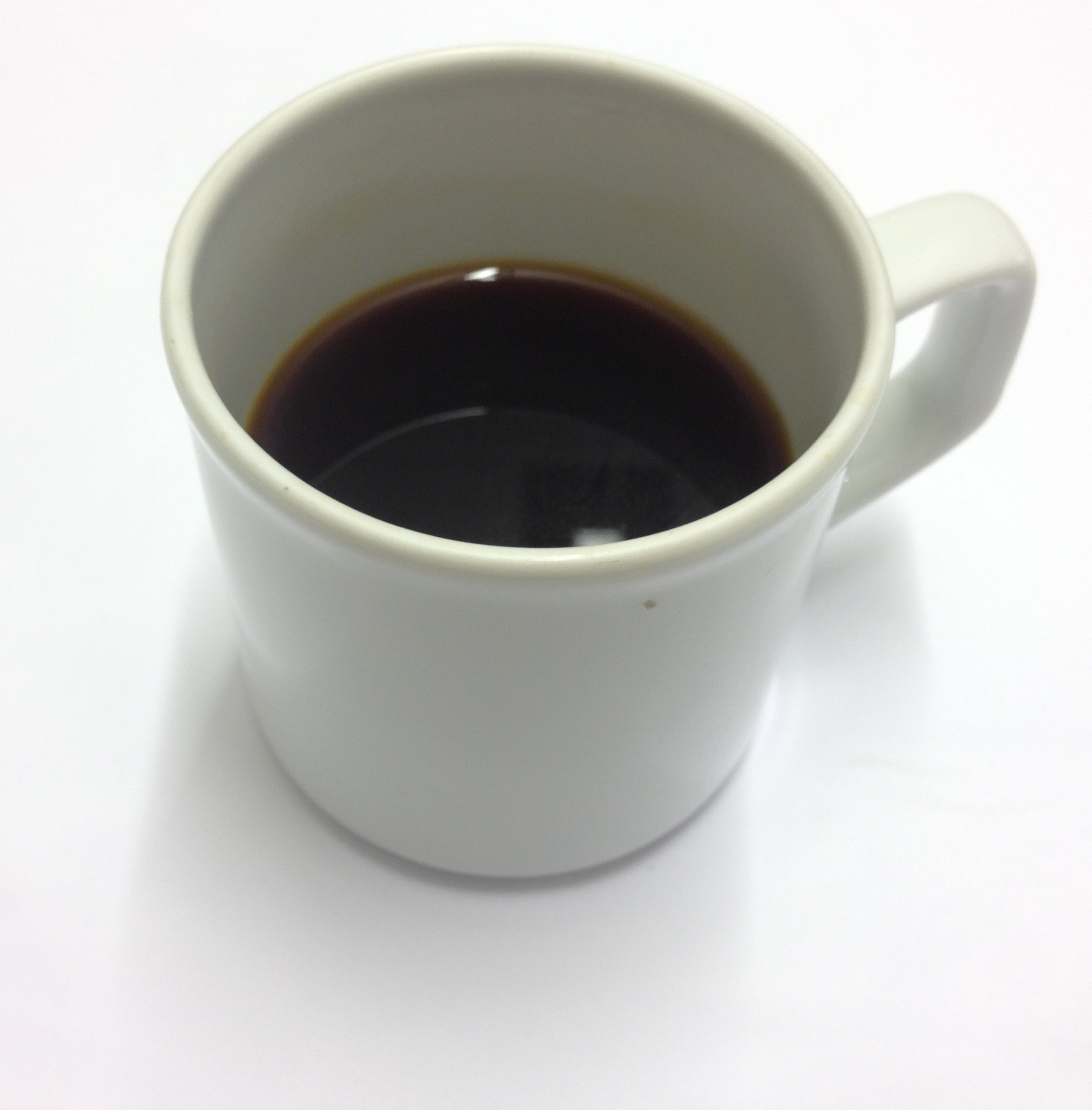
Coffee is a popular source of caffeine.

Caffeine-induced psychosis is a rare clinical phenomenon characterized by psychotic symptoms such as delusions, paranoia, and hallucinations. It is typically triggered by the chronic abuse or acute ingestion of high doses of caffeine and can manifest in individuals with no prior history of mental illness. Additionally, high caffeine intake may exacerbate pre-existing psychotic symptoms in individuals with schizophrenia.

Psychosis refers to a cluster of symptoms affecting the mind characterized by a loss of contact with reality. During an episode of psychosis, an individual's thoughts and perceptions are severely disrupted, impairing their ability to recognize reality. This state of mind can be precipitated by a range of factors, including psychiatric conditions such as schizophrenia and bipolar disorder; neurodegenerative diseases such as Parkinson's disease and Alzheimer's disease; and the consumption or withdrawal of certain substances, particularly stimulant drugs.

== Caffeine-related psychiatric disorders ==
While rare, caffeine-induced psychosis has been reported in clinical studies and case reports. The Diagnostic and Statistical Manual of Mental Disorders, Fifth Edition – Text Revision (DSM-5-TR) outlines five caffeine-related syndromes, including caffeine-induced anxiety disorder, caffeine-induced sleep disorder, and unspecified caffeine-related disorders, under stimulant-related diagnostic codes. The International Classification of Diseases, Tenth Revision (ICD-10) classifies disorders associated with caffeine more broadly as "mental and behavioural disorders due to use of other stimulants, including caffeine".

Several case studies and reviews have suggested that excessive caffeine intake may provoke psychotic or manic symptoms in vulnerable individuals. Caffeine may also worsen recovery in patients with bipolar disorder or pre-existing psychotic conditions, such as schizophrenia. This has led some clinical guidelines to recommend reducing or eliminating caffeine intake during psychiatric treatment, particularly for mania.

Some case reports suggest that psychotic symptoms can emerge in individuals without a history of mental illness after consuming high doses of caffeine. Although not conclusively established, it is hypothesized that caffeine may exacerbate underlying paranoid traits or lower the threshold for developing psychopathology in those predisposed to psychosis. Symptom resolution following caffeine discontinuation has been observed in several cases, supporting the existence of caffeine-induced psychosis.

For people who consume excessive amounts of caffeine without a prior psychotic disorder, a doctor may prescribe antipsychotics to treat psychotic symptoms.

== Mechanisms ==
Caffeine acts as an antagonist of adenosine receptors, particularly A1 and A2A receptors. Under normal conditions, adenosine inhibits neurotransmission, promoting sleep and suppressing arousal. By blocking these receptors, caffeine limits adenosine's inhibitory influence, resulting in increased neuronal activity and the enhanced release of excitatory neurotransmitters, such as dopamine and glutamate.

This mechanism contributes to improved alertness, attention, and mood at moderate doses. However, high doses or chronic overuse may overstimulate dopamine pathways in the brain, particularly in areas such as the mesolimbic system, which are associated with the development of psychotic symptoms.

The elevated dopaminergic activity resembles, to a lesser degree, the neurochemical abnormalities observed in psychotic disorders and may trigger hallucinations, delusions, or manic symptoms, particularly in individuals who are genetically or biologically vulnerable.

Additionally, caffeine-induced sleep deprivation, anxiety, and increased arousal can further increase the risk of psychotic symptoms, either independently or in combination with other stressors or substances.

== Epidemiology ==
=== General population ===
Although a definitive causal relationship has not been established, caffeine's effect on dopamine levels may increase arousal and contribute to the onset of psychotic symptoms. Additionally, symptom improvement has been observed following caffeine reduction in individuals with pre-existing psychotic disorders. These findings suggest that individuals with a predisposition to psychosis may have a lower threshold for developing psychopathological symptoms in response to caffeine intake.

=== Individuals with schizophrenia ===
People with schizophrenia may be more likely to overuse caffeine for a variety of reasons. Many people with schizophrenia use caffeine to combat boredom or counteract the sedating effects of antipsychotic medications. Many antipsychotic medications can also cause dry mouth. Additionally, people with schizophrenia may experience psychogenic polydipsia (excessive fluid intake in the absence of physiological thirst). These factors could increase the amount of caffeine an individual may consume.

There is a correlation between schizophrenia and smoking. Smoking tends to reduce the amount of ingested caffeine, so people with schizophrenia may consume more caffeine than others to compensate for this.

"Caffeine use can cause restlessness, nervousness, insomnia, rambling speech, and agitation", potentially worsening the symptoms of schizophrenia. "Caffeine is metabolized by the CYP1A2 enzyme and also acts as a competitive inhibitor of this enzyme. Thus, caffeine can interact with a wide range of psychiatric medications, including antidepressant agents, antipsychotic agents, antimanic agents, antianxiety agents, and sedative agents."

Consuming less than 250 mg of caffeine per day has been associated with better results on cognitive tasks in people with schizophrenia. However, more research is needed to determine whether the amount of caffeine that is safe for people with schizophrenia (>250 mg/day) is the same as that for the general population.
