= Cannabis-induced psychotic disorder =

Psychotic disorder caused by cannabis

- Other names: CIPD, cannabis-induced psychosis, CIP, cannabis-associated psychotic symptoms, CAPS, cannabis psychosis
- Specialty: Psychiatry, addiction psychiatry
- Symptoms: Hallucinations, delusions, paranoia, insomnia
- Complications: Self-harm, suicide
- Causes: cannabis, cannabinoids
- Risk factors: History of depression, anxiety, or bipolar disorder
- Treatment: Atypical antipsychotics
- Frequency: 0.47%

Cannabis-induced psychotic disorder (CIPD), also known as cannabis-induced psychosis, cannabis-associated psychotic symptoms, or cannabis psychosis, is a mental disorder characterized by psychotic symptoms such as hallucinations, delusions, severe paranoia, disorganized thinking, disorganized behavior, and insomnia that occurs following the use of or withdrawal from cannabis. Cannabis-induced psychotic disorder is more likely to occur in individuals with a personal or family history of mental illness. The incidence rate of CIPD is estimated to be 1 in 200 people who use cannabis. More than 50% of patients recover within 24 hours, but the disorder may last for weeks or months if left untreated. The treatment is atypical antipsychotic medication.

== Signs and symptoms ==
The symptoms of cannabis-induced psychotic disorder involve the symptoms of psychosis such as severe paranoia, confusion, agitation, hallucinations, delusions, disorganized thinking, and disorganized behavior. Memory problems and insomnia may also occur. The symptoms typically begin shortly after using cannabis or during cannabis withdrawal and continue until they are treated with an antipsychotic medication.

== Diagnosis ==
Cannabis-induced psychotic disorder has the code 6C41.6 in the ICD-11.

The risk of cannabis-induced psychotic disorder is higher for those who use high-potency THC (greater than 10% THC) and for those who use cannabis often. The risk is also higher for younger and male individuals. A history of mental illness, such as depression, anxiety, or bipolar disorder, also increases the risk of psychosis. In addition to cannabis, synthetic cannabinoids can also induce psychosis.

== Treatment ==
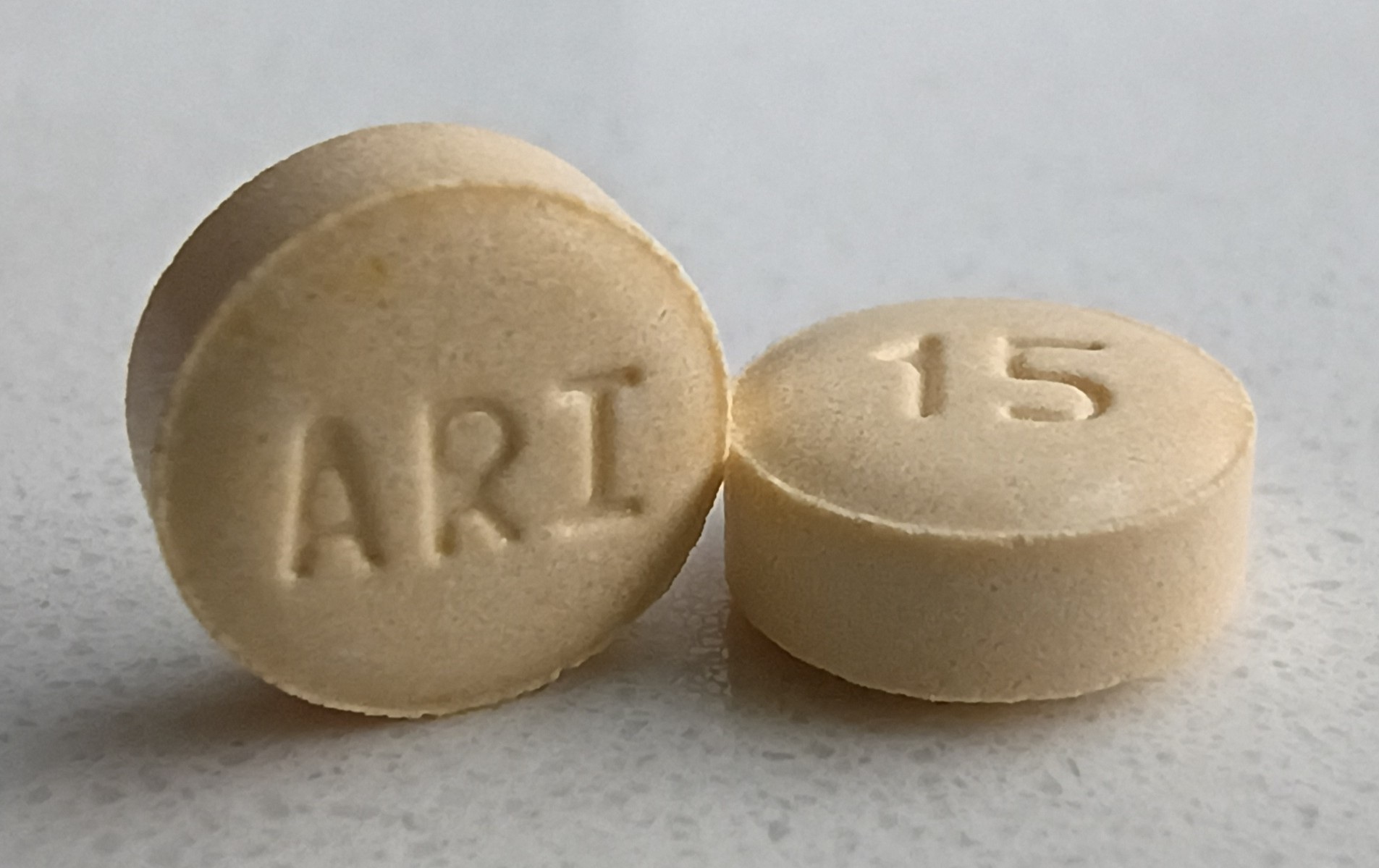
Aripiprazole 15 mg is used to treat cannabis-induced psychotic disorder.

Treatment consists of atypical antipsychotics such as risperidone, olanzapine, aripiprazole, or quetiapine. Haloperidol, a typical antipsychotic may be given in the emergency room to stabilize a patient before they are switched to an atypical antipsychotic for maintenance therapy. Aripiprazole, brexpiprazole, cariprazine, and lurasidone are third-generation antipsychotics used to treat substance-induced psychosis. Compared to second and first-generation antipsychotics, third-generation antipsychotics have a better side effect profile and improved tolerability for long-term use. Individuals are also recommended to practice abstinence from cannabis and can be given counseling designed to assist with preventing a relapse of substance use.

== Prognosis ==
Individuals with symptoms lasting longer than 1 week or a history of psychosis have hospitalization rates ranging between 54% to 76%.

Cannabis-induced psychotic disorder is later diagnosed as schizophrenia in approximately 34% of individuals. This was found to be comparatively higher than hallucinogens (26%) and amphetamines (22%). Researchers maintain there exists "a strong association" between schizophrenia and cannabis use.

Left untreated, cannabis-induced psychotic disorder has led to suicide.

== Epidemiology ==
Cannabis-induced psychotic disorder has been reported to occur at a rate of 1 in 200 people who use cannabis, or 0.47%.

At an epidemiological level, a dose–response relationship exists between cannabis use and increased risk of psychosis and earlier onset of psychosis. Researchers found an increase in schizophrenia and psychosis cases in Canada linked to cannabis use disorder following the drug's legalization. According to the National Academies of Sciences, Engineering and Medicine, there is substantial evidence of a statistical association between cannabis use and the development of schizophrenia or other chronic psychoses, with the highest risk potentially among the most frequent users.

In 2016 a meta-analysis was published on associations studies covering a range of dosing habits, again showing that cannabis use is associated with a significantly increased risk of psychosis, and alleged that a dose–response relationship exists between the level of cannabis use and risk of psychosis. The risk was increased 4-fold with daily use.

A 2016 study regarded the epidemiologic evidence on cannabis use and psychosis strong enough "to warrant a public health message that cannabis use can increase the risk of psychotic disorders." A public health message was subsequently issued in August 2019 by the Surgeon General of the United States. The review also stated "If the association between cannabis and schizophrenia is causal and of the magnitude estimated across studies to date, this would equate to a schizophrenia lifetime risk of approximately 2% in regular cannabis users (though risk for broader psychotic outcomes will be greater). This implies that about 98% of regular cannabis users will not develop schizophrenia...[and that] risk could be much greater in those at a higher genetic risk, or in those who use particularly potent strains of cannabis."

== Research ==
Even in those with no family history of psychosis, the administration of pure THC in clinical settings has been demonstrated to elicit transient psychotic symptoms.

== See also ==
- Hallucinogen-induced psychotic disorder (HIPD)
- Schizophrenia
- Substance-induced psychosis (SIP)
