= Alcoholic hallucinosis =

Complication of alcohol misuse in people with alcohol use disorder

- Other names: alcohol-related psychosis, alcohol-induced psychotic disorder
- Ethanol
- Specialty: Psychiatry
- Treatment: benzodiazepines

Alcoholic hallucinosis is a complication of alcohol misuse in people with alcohol use disorder. It can occur during acute intoxication or withdrawal with the potential of having delirium tremens. Alcohol hallucinosis is a rather uncommon alcohol-induced psychotic disorder almost exclusively seen in chronic alcoholics who have many consecutive years of severe and heavy drinking during their lifetime. Alcoholic hallucinosis develops about 12 to 24 hours after the heavy drinking stops suddenly, and can last for days. It involves auditory and visual hallucinations, most commonly accusatory or threatening voices. The risk of developing alcoholic hallucinosis is increased by long-term heavy alcohol abuse and the use of other drugs. Descriptions of the condition date back to at least 1907.

== Signs and symptoms ==
There are many symptoms that could possibly occur before the hallucinations begin. Symptoms include headache, nausea, dizziness, irritability, insomnia, and indisposition. Typically, alcoholic hallucinosis has a sudden onset.

== Cause ==
The cause of alcoholic hallucinosis is unclear. It seems to be highly related to the presence of dopamine in the limbic system with the possibility of other systems.

== Alcoholic hallucinosis vs. delirium tremens ==
Both alcoholic hallucinosis and delirium tremens have been thought of as different manifestations of the same physiological process in the body during alcohol withdrawal. Alcoholic hallucinosis is a much less serious diagnosis than delirium tremens. Delirium tremens does not appear suddenly, unlike alcoholic hallucinosis. Delirium tremens also takes approximately 48 to 72 hours to appear after the heavy drinking stops. A tremor develops in the hands and can also affect the head and body. A common symptom of delirium tremens is that people become severely uncoordinated. Alcoholic hallucinosis has a much better prognosis than delirium tremens. Untreated delirium tremens can be fatal.

== Treatment ==
In general, alcohol abusers with withdrawal symptoms, such as alcoholic hallucinosis, have a deficiency of several vitamins and minerals and their bodies could cope with the withdrawal more easily by taking nutritional supplements. Long-term alcohol abuse can create a deficiency of thiamine, magnesium, zinc, folate, and phosphate as well as cause low blood sugar. However, several drugs have been shown to stop the hallucinations. Neuroleptics and benzodiazepines showed normalization. Common benzodiazepines include chlordiazepoxide and lorazepam. Management with a combination of abstinence from alcohol and the use of neuroleptics has been shown to be effective. It is also possible to treat withdrawal before major symptoms start to happen in the body. Diazepam and chlordiazepoxide have proven to be effective in treating alcohol withdrawal symptoms such as alcoholic hallucinosis. With the help of these specific medications, the process of withdrawal is easier to go through, making alcoholic hallucinosis less likely to occur.

== See also ==
- Seeing pink elephants
- The Lost Weekend, a novel and Oscar winning film that includes a fictional portrayal of the illness
