= Addiction psychiatry =

Medical subspecialty within psychiatry

Addiction Psychiatrist
Occupation
- Names: Physician, Psychiatrist, Addiction Psychiatrist, Addictionologist
- Occupation type: Profession
- Activity sectors: Medicine, Psychiatry

Description
- Education required: M.D./ D.O. and certification through the American Board of Psychiatry and Neurology in Adult Psychiatry
- Fields of employment: Hospitals, Clinics
- Related jobs: Addiction Medicine

Addiction psychiatry is a medical subspecialty within psychiatry that focuses on the evaluation, diagnosis, and treatment of people who have one or more disorders related to addiction. This may include disorders involving legal and illegal drugs, gambling, sex, food, and other impulse control disorders. Addiction psychiatrists are substance use disorder experts. Growing amounts of scientific knowledge, such as the health effects and treatments for substance use disorders, have led to advancements in the field of addiction psychiatry. These advancements in understanding the neurobiology of rewarding behavior, along with federal funding, has allowed for ample opportunity for research in the discipline of addiction psychiatry. Addiction psychiatry is an expanding field, and currently there is a high demand for substance use disorder experts in both the private and public sector.

== History ==
Addiction psychiatry is a relatively new subspecialty of psychiatry. As of October 1991, the American Board of Psychiatry and Neurology and the American Board of Medical Specialties (ABMS), with support of the American Psychiatric Association, established a "Committee on Certification of Added Qualifications in Addiction Psychiatry." This was a way to identify the most educated and experienced psychiatrists in the profession; however, it was not until 1993 when "Addiction Psychiatry" was granted sub-specialization status. Years later, in 1997 the committee's board of trustees along with the ABMS renamed the committee "Committee on Certification in the Subspecialty of Addiction Psychiatry". The committee became more geared toward developing the subspecialty of addiction psychiatry. As of 1997, there were only 13 addiction psychiatry programs that the Accreditation Council for Graduate Medical Education (ACGME) recognized. Currently the ACGME recognizes 45 different residency programs in the United States.

== Profession ==
=== Qualifications ===
In order to become a certified addiction psychiatrist, one must first have completed medical school and further be certified as a general psychiatrist by the ABPN. Next, general psychiatrists must commit themselves to an ACGME-accredited residency in addiction psychiatry. The addiction psychiatry residencies are one-year programs set in a hospital or clinical setting where general psychiatrists learn how to diagnose and treat substance-use disorders as well as potential coexisting psychiatric disorders. After completing one of these residency programs addiction psychiatrists are then capable of being hired in either a private or public setting.

=== Status ===
An increase in pressure from local and federal governments to provide for patients suffering from addiction has resulted in the increased demand for addiction psychiatrists. Federal funding for the prevention of addiction has been carried out via block grants. These investments in addiction treatment yield savings in overall societal costs, as general health care costs diminish. As of June 2018, the average reported salary of addiction psychiatrists was $250,000. Additionally, 47 addiction psychiatrist appeared on U.S. News & World Report's list of U.S. News Top Doctors. A further 16 addiction psychiatrists were nominated by their peers to an even more selective group of America's Top Doctors.

== Treatment ==
=== Background ===
Addiction psychiatry aims to treat individuals with addiction issues along with co-occurring psychiatric disorders, otherwise known as patients with dual diagnosis. Addiction psychiatrists treat a wide variety of patients of all ages with varying conditions. Each case of addiction is unique and addiction psychiatrists must cater to each individual patient. Addiction psychiatrists must recognize the numerous factors that tie into each individual's struggle with an addiction.

For example, substance use often occurs among individuals dealing with mood disorders and other social stresses. Addiction psychiatrists must be able to recognize, diagnose, and treat the disorders concurrent with the substance use issues. Furthermore, addiction psychiatrists must also recognize certain health effects from illicit drugs in order to properly treat each individual.

=== Methodology ===
Addiction psychiatry encompasses both medicine and psychotherapy, or professional therapeutic interaction, as the means of treating individuals. In a conventional addiction psychiatry session, addiction psychiatrists will gain a better understanding of their patient's lifestyle by gathering medical history and the patient's mental health concerns. Next, the psychiatrist will identify individualized solutions to the patient's problem; this may include medicines and/or psychotherapy. Addiction psychiatrists are uniquely equipped to handle co-occurring mental health diagnoses and substance use disorders (whether in the context of active use, withdrawal or early/late recovery). While there are many FDA-approved medications for substance use disorder treatment, addiction psychiatrists can attune to the most appropriate medication for their specific patient. Acamprosate, disulfiram, and naltrexone are the most common medications used to treat alcohol use disorder. Buprenorphine, methadone, and naltrexone are the most common medications used to treat OUD. Moreover, addiction psychiatrists recommend the benefits of 12-Step programs such as Narcotics Anonymous and Alcoholics Anonymous and often encourage patients to seek external support. Addiction psychiatry can also be a method of recovery for those who have been unable to manage their substance use disorder without prior success.

== See also ==
- American Academy of Addiction Psychiatry
- Addiction Medicine
- Addiction psychology
