= Pleonasm =

Redundancy in linguistic expression

Pleonasm (/ˈpliː.əˌnæzəm/; from Ancient Greek πλεονασμός pleonasmós, from πλέον pléon 'to be in excess') is redundancy in linguistic expression, such as "black darkness", "burning fire", or "the man he said". It is a manifestation of tautology by traditional rhetorical criteria. Pleonasm may also be used for emphasis, or because the phrase has become established in a certain form. Tautology and pleonasm are not consistently differentiated in literature.

== Usage ==
Most often, pleonasm is understood to mean a word or phrase which is useless, clichéd, or repetitive, but a pleonasm can also be simply an unremarkable use of idiom. It can aid in achieving a specific linguistic effect, be it social, poetic or literary. Pleonasm sometimes serves the same function as rhetorical repetition—it can be used to reinforce an idea, contention or question, rendering writing clearer and easier to understand. Pleonasm can serve as a redundancy check; if a word is unknown, misunderstood, misheard, or if the medium of communication is poor—a static-filled radio transmission or sloppy handwriting—pleonastic phrases can help ensure that the meaning is communicated even if some of the words are lost.

=== Idiomatic expressions ===
Some pleonastic phrases are part of a language's idiom, such as safe haven in American English. They are so common that their use is unremarkable for native speakers, although in many cases the redundancy can be dropped with no loss of meaning.

When expressing possibility, English speakers often use potentially pleonastic expressions such as It might be possible or perhaps it's possible, where both terms (verb might or adverb perhaps along with the adjective possible) have the same meaning under certain constructions. Many speakers of English use such expressions for possibility in general, such that most instances of such expressions by those speakers are in fact pleonastic. Others, however, use this expression only to indicate a distinction between ontological possibility and epistemic possibility, as in "Both the ontological possibility of X under current conditions and the ontological impossibility of X under current conditions are epistemically possible" (in logical terms, "I am not aware of any facts inconsistent with the truth of proposition X, but I am likewise not aware of any facts inconsistent with the truth of the negation of X"). The habitual use of the double construction to indicate possibility per se is far less widespread among speakers of most other languages (except in Spanish; see examples); rather, almost all speakers of those languages use one term in a single expression:

- French: Il est possible or il peut arriver.
- Portuguese: O que é que, lit. "What is it that", a more emphatic way of saying "what is"; O que usually suffices.
- Romanian: Este posibil or se poate întâmpla.
- Typical Spanish pleonasms
  - Voy a subir arriba – I am going to go up upstairs, "arriba" not being necessary.
  - Entra adentro – enter inside, "adentro" not being necessary.
- Turkish has many pleonastic constructs because certain verbs necessitate objects:
  - yemek yemek – to eat food.
  - yazı yazmak – to write writing.
  - dışarı çıkmak – to exit outside.
  - içeri girmek – to enter inside.
  - oyun oynamak – to play a game.

In a satellite-framed language such as English, verb phrases containing particles that denote direction of motion are so frequent that even when such a particle is pleonastic, it seems natural to include it (e.g. "enter into").

=== Professional and scholarly use ===
Some pleonastic phrases, when used in professional or scholarly writing, may reflect a standardized usage that has evolved or a meaning familiar to specialists but not necessarily to those outside that discipline. Such examples as "null and void", "each and every", "cease and desist" are legal doublets that are part of legally operative language that is often drafted into legal documents. A classic example of such usage was that by the Lord Chancellor at the time (1864), Lord Westbury, in the English case of ex parte Gorely, when he described a phrase in an Act as "redundant and pleonastic". This type of usage may be favored in certain contexts. However, it may also be disfavored when used gratuitously to portray false erudition, obfuscate, or otherwise introduce verbiage, especially in disciplines where imprecision may introduce ambiguities (such as the natural sciences).

=== Literary uses ===
Examples from Baroque, Mannerist, and Victorian provide a counterpoint to Strunk's advocacy of concise writing:

- "This was the most unkindest cut of all." — William Shakespeare, Julius Caesar (Act 3, Scene 2, 183)
- "I will be brief: your noble son is mad:/Mad call I it; for, to define true madness,/What is't but to be nothing else but mad?" — Hamlet (Act 2, Scene 2)
- "Let me tell you this, when social workers offer you, free, gratis and for nothing, something to hinder you from swooning, which with them is an obsession, it is useless to recoil ..." — Samuel Beckett, Molloy

== Types ==
There are various kinds of pleonasm, including bilingual tautological expressions, syntactic pleonasm, semantic pleonasm and morphological pleonasm:

=== Bilingual tautological expressions ===
A bilingual tautological expression is a phrase that combines words that mean the same thing in two different languages. An example of a bilingual tautological expression is the Yiddish expression מים אחרונים וואַסער mayim akhroynem vaser. It literally means 'water last water' and refers to 'water for washing the hands after meal, grace water'. Its first element, mayim, derives from the Hebrew מים [majim] 'water'. Its second element, vaser, derives from the Middle High German word vaser 'water'.

According to Ghil'ad Zuckermann, Yiddish abounds with both bilingual tautological compounds and bilingual tautological first names.

The following are examples of bilingual tautological compounds in Yiddish:

- פֿינצטער חושך fíntster khóyshekh 'very dark', literally 'dark darkness', traceable back to the Middle High German word vinster 'dark' and the Hebrew word חושך ħōshekh 'darkness'.
- חמור־אייזל khamer-éyzļ 'womanizer', literally 'donkey-donkey', traceable back to the Hebrew word חמור [ħă'mōr] 'donkey' and the Middle High German word esel 'donkey'.

The following are examples of bilingual tautological first names in Yiddish:

- דוב־בער Dov-Ber, literally 'bear-bear', traceable back to the Hebrew word דב dov 'bear' and the Middle High German word bër 'bear'.
- צבי־הירש Tsvi-Hirsh, literally 'deer-deer', traceable back to the Hebrew word צבי tsvi 'deer' and the Middle High German word hirz 'deer'.
- זאב־וואָלף Ze'ev-Volf, literally 'wolf-wolf', traceable back to the Hebrew word זאב ze'ev 'wolf' and the Middle High German word volf 'wolf'.
- אריה־לייב Aryeh-Leib, literally 'lion-lion', traceable back to the Hebrew word אריה arye 'lion' and the Middle High German word lewe 'lion'.

=== Syntactic pleonasm ===
Syntactic pleonasm occurs when the grammar of a language makes certain function words optional. For example, consider the following English sentences:

- "I know you're coming."
- "I know that you're coming."

In this construction, the conjunction that is optional when joining a sentence to a verb phrase with know. Both sentences are grammatically correct, but the word that is pleonastic in this case. By contrast, when a sentence is in spoken form and the verb involved is one of assertion, the use of that makes clear that the present speaker is making an indirect rather than a direct quotation, such that he is not imputing particular words to the person he describes as having made an assertion; the demonstrative adjective that also does not fit such an example. Also, some writers may use "that" for technical clarity reasons. In some languages, such as French, the word is not optional and should therefore not be considered pleonastic.

The same phenomenon occurs in Spanish with subject pronouns. Since Spanish is a null-subject language, which allows subject pronouns to be deleted when understood, the following sentences mean the same:

- "Yo te amo."
- "Te amo."

In this case, the pronoun yo ('I') is grammatically optional; both sentences mean "I love you" (however, they may not have the same tone or intention—this depends on pragmatics rather than grammar). Such differing but syntactically equivalent constructions, in many languages, may also indicate a difference in register.

The process of deleting pronouns is called pro-dropping, and it also happens in many other languages, such as Korean, Japanese, Hungarian, Latin, Italian, Portuguese, Swahili, Slavic languages, and the Lao language.

In contrast, formal English requires an overt subject in each clause. A sentence may not need a subject to have valid meaning, but to satisfy the syntactic requirement for an explicit subject a pleonastic (or dummy pronoun) is used; only the first sentence in the following pair is acceptable English:

- "It's raining."
- "Is raining."

In this example the pleonastic "it" fills the subject function, but it contributes no meaning to the sentence. The second sentence, which omits the pleonastic it is marked as ungrammatical although no meaning is lost by the omission. Elements such as "it" or "there", serving as empty subject markers, are also called (syntactic) expletives, or dummy pronouns. Compare:

- "There is rain."
- "Today is rain."

The pleonastic ne (ne pléonastique), expressing uncertainty in formal French, works as follows:

- "Je crains qu'il ne pleuve."
  ('I fear it may rain.')
- "Ces idées sont plus difficiles à comprendre que je ne pensais."
  ('These ideas are harder to understand than I thought.')

Two more striking examples of French pleonastic construction are aujourd'hui and Qu'est-ce que c'est?.

The word aujourd'hui/au jour d'hui is translated as 'today', but originally means "on the day of today" since the now obsolete hui means "today". The expression au jour d'aujourd'hui (translated as "on the day of today") is common in spoken language and demonstrates that the original construction of aujourd'hui is lost. It is considered a pleonasm.

The phrase Qu'est-ce que c'est? meaning 'What's that?' or 'What is it?', while literally, it means "What is it that it is?".

There are examples of the pleonastic, or dummy, negative in English, such as the construction, heard in the New England region of the United States, in which the phrase "So don't I" is intended to have the same positive meaning as "So do I."

When Robert South said, "It is a pleonasm, a figure usual in Scripture, by a multiplicity of expressions to signify one notable thing", he was observing the Biblical Hebrew poetic propensity to repeat thoughts in different words, since written Biblical Hebrew was a comparatively early form of written language and was written using oral patterning, which has many pleonasms. In particular, very many verses of the Psalms are split into two halves, each of which says much the same thing in different words. The complex rules and forms of written language as distinct from spoken language were not as well-developed as they are today when the books making up the Old Testament were written. See also parallelism (rhetoric).

=== Semantic pleonasm ===
Semantic pleonasm is a question more of style and usage than of grammar. Linguists usually call this redundancy to avoid confusion with syntactic pleonasm, a more important phenomenon for theoretical linguistics. It usually takes one of two forms: Overlap or prolixity.

Overlap: One word's semantic component is subsumed by the other:

- "Receive a free gift with every purchase."; a gift is usually already free.
- "The plumber fixed our hot water heater." (This pleonasm was famously attacked by American comedian George Carlin, but is not truly redundant; a device that increases the temperature of cold water to room temperature would also be a water heater.)
- The Big Friendly Giant (title of a children's book by Roald Dahl); giants are inherently big.

Prolixity: A phrase may have words which add nothing, or nothing logical or relevant, to the meaning.

- "I'm going down south."
  (South is not really "down", it is just drawn that way on maps by convention.)
- "I can't seem to face up to the facts."
- "He entered into the room."
- "Every mother's child" (as in The Christmas Song by Nat King Cole', also known as Chestnuts roasting...). (Being a child, or a human at all, generally implies being the child of/to a mother. So the redundancy here is used to broaden the context of the child's curiosity regarding the sleigh of Santa Claus, including the concept of maternity. The full line goes: "And every mother's child is gonna spy, to see if reindeer really know how to fly". One can furthermore argue that the word "mother" is included for the purpose of lyrical flow, adding two syllables, which make the line sound complete, as "every child" would be too short to fit the lyrical/rhyme scheme.)
- "Ilk man and mother's son take heed" from Tam o' Shanter written by Robert Burns in 1790 (Ilk is a now-archaic Scots determiner meaning each or every, so this adds a second pleonasm to the mother's child example above, double-emphasising that he means absolutely every man, as well as fitting the metre of that verse)
- "What therefore God hath joined together, let no man put asunder."
- "He raised up his hands in a gesture of surrender."
- "Where are you at?"
- "Located" or similar before a preposition: "the store is located on Main St." The preposition contains the idea of locatedness and does not need a servant.
- "The house itself" for "the house", and similar: unnecessary re-specifiers.
- "Actual fact": fact.
- "On a daily basis": daily.
- "This particular item": this item.
- "Different" or "separate" after numbers: for example:
  - "Four different species" are merely "four species", as two non-different species are together one same species. However, in "a discount if you buy ten different items", "different" has meaning, because if the ten items include two packets of frozen peas of the same weight and brand, those ten items are not all different.
  - "Nine separate cars": cars are always separate.
- "Despite the fact that": although.

== See also ==
- Ambiguity – Type of uncertainty of meaning where several interpretations are possible
- Buzzword – Word or phrase used to impress
- Elegant variation – Use of synonyms to avoid repetition
- Error correction code – Scheme for controlling errors in data over noisy communication channels
- Figure of speech – Purposeful use of language
- Glossary of rhetorical terms
- Graphomania – Obsessive impulse to write
- Hypergraphia – Psychological condition wherein a person is compelled to write or draw
- Irish bull – Ludicrous, incongruent or absurd statement
- List of tautological place names – Toponyms composed of synonyms
- Logorrhea (psychology) – Communication disorder
- Purple prose – Overly ornate and distracting prose
- RAS syndrome – Acronym redundantly coupled with its word(s)
- Redundancy (linguistics) – Information that is expressed more than once
- Reduplication – Linguistic phenomenon
- Verbosity – Excessive use of words
