= Muteness =

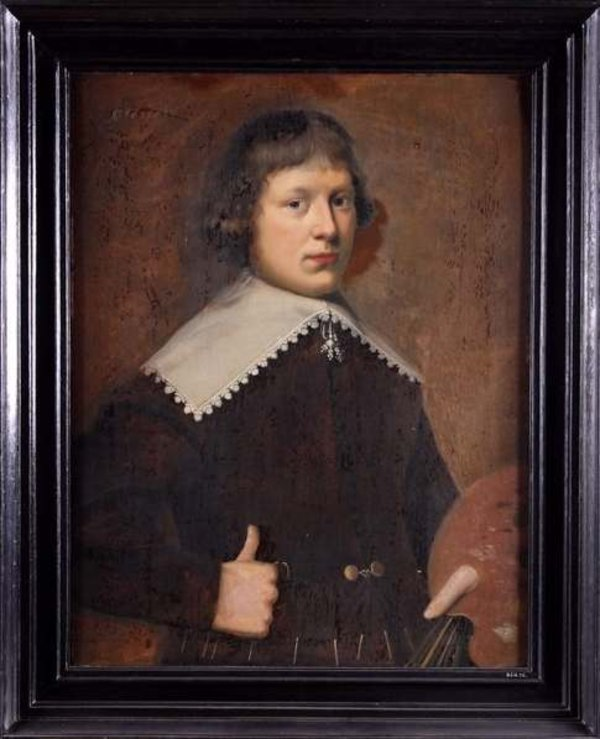
- Jan Jansz. de Stomme, a deaf-mute 17th century Dutch Golden Age portrait painter.
- Specialty: Neurology, psychiatry, laryngology, Phoniatrics

In human development, muteness or mutism (Note: (from Latin mutus 'silent')) is defined as an absence of speech, with or without an ability to hear the speech of others. Mutism is typically understood as a person's inability to speak, and commonly observed by their family members, caregivers, teachers, doctors, or speech and language pathologists. It may not be a permanent condition, as muteness can be caused or manifest due to several different phenomena, such as physiological injury, illness, medical side effects, psychological trauma, developmental disorders, or neurological disorders. A specific physical disability or communication disorder can be more easily diagnosed. Loss of previously normal speech (aphasia) can be due to accidents, disease, or surgical complication; it is rarely for psychological reasons.

Treatment or management also varies by cause and this can often be determined after a speech assessment. Treatment can sometimes restore speech. If not, a range of assistive and augmentative communication devices are available.

== Causes ==
=== Biological causes ===
Biological causes of mutism may stem from several different sources. One cause of muteness may be problems with the physiology involved in speech, for example, the mouth or tongue. Mutism may be due to apraxia, that is, problems with coordination of muscles involved in speech. Another cause may be a medical condition impacting the physical structures involved in speech, for example, loss of voice due to the injury, paralysis, or illness of the larynx. Anarthria is a severe form of dysarthria, in which the coordination of movements of the mouth and tongue or the conscious coordination of the lungs are damaged.

Neurological damage due to stroke may cause loss or impairment of speech, termed aphasia. Neurological damage or problems with development of the area of the brain involved in speech production, Broca's area, may cause muteness. Trauma or injury to Broca's area, located in the left inferior frontal cortex of the brain, can cause muteness. Muteness may follow brain surgery. For example, there is a spectrum of possible neurobehavioural deficits in the posterior fossa syndrome in children following cerebellar tumor surgery.

=== Psychological causes ===
When children do not speak, psychological problems or emotional stress, such as anxiety, may be involved. Children may not speak due to selective mutism. Selective mutism is a condition in which the child speaks only in certain situations or with certain people, such as close family members. Assessment is needed to rule out possible illness or other conditions and to determine treatment. Prevalence is low, but not as rare as once thought. Selective mutism should not be confused with a child who does not speak and cannot speak due to physical disabilities. It is common for symptoms to occur before the age of five. Not all children express the same symptoms.

Selective mutism may occur in conjunction with autism spectrum disorder or other diagnoses. Differential diagnosis between selective mutism and language delay associated with autism or other disorders is needed to determine appropriate treatment.

Adults who previously had speech and subsequently ceased talking may not speak for psychological or emotional reasons, though this is rare as a cause for adults. Absence or paucity of speech in adults may also be associated with specific psychiatric disorders.

=== Developmental and neurological causes ===
Absence of speech in children may involve communication disorders or language delays. Communication disorders or developmental language delays may occur for several different reasons.

Language delays may be associated with other developmental delays. For example, children with Down syndrome often have impaired language and speech.

Children with autism, categorized as a neurodevelopmental disorder in the DSM-5, often demonstrate language delays.

== Treatment ==
Evaluation of children with language delays is necessary to determine whether the language delay was caused by another condition. Examples of such conditions are autism spectrum disorder, hearing loss and apraxia. The manner of treatment depends on the diagnosed condition. Language delays may impact expressive language, receptive language, or both. Communication disorders may impact articulation, fluency (stuttering) and other specified and unspecified communication disorders. For example, speech and language services may focus on the production of speech sounds for children with phonological challenges.

Intervention services and treatment programs have been specifically developed for autistic children with language delays. For example, pivotal response treatment is a well-established and researched intervention that includes family participation. Mark Sundberg's verbal behavior framework is another well-established assessment and treatment modality that is incorporated into many applied behavior analysis (ABA) early intervention treatment programs for young children with autism and communication challenges.

Treatment for absence of speech due to apraxia, involves assessment, and, based on the assessment, occupational therapy, physical therapy, and/or speech therapy. Treatment for selective mutism involves assessment, counseling, and positive supports. Treatment for absence of speech in adults who previously had speech involves assessment to determine cause, including medical and surgery related causes, followed by appropriate treatment or management. Treatment may involve counseling, or rehabilitation services, depending upon cause of loss of speech.

== Management ==
Management involves the use of appropriate assistive devices, called alternative and augmentative communications. Suitability and appropriateness of modality will depend on users' physical abilities and cognitive functioning.

Augmentative and alternative communication technology ranges from elaborated software for tablets to enable complex communication with an auditory component to less technologically involved strategies. For example, a common method involves the use of pictures that can be attached to velcro strips to create an accessible communication modality that does not require the cognitive or fine motor skills needed to manipulate a tablet.

Speech-generating devices can help people with speech deficiencies associated with medical conditions that affect speech, communication disorders that impair speech, or surgeries that have impacted speech. Speech-generating devices continue to improve in ease of use.

== See also ==
- Aphonia
- Deafness
- Developmental disability
- Dyslalia
- Speech delay
- Vocal cord paresis
- Nonspeaking autism
