= Autism with port-wine stain syndrome =

- Other names: Autism-facial port-wine stain syndrome
- Specialty: Medical genetics
- Symptoms: Autism, epilepsy and the presence of a port wine stain
- Complications: Epilepsy
- Usual onset: Conception
- Duration: Lifelong
- Causes: Genetic mutation
- Prevention: none
- Prognosis: Good
- Frequency: very rare, only 4 cases have been described in medical literature
- Deaths: -

Autism with port-wine stain syndrome is a very rare genetic disorder which is characterized by the unilateral presence of a port-wine stain, autism/autistic-like behaviour that is associated with social awkwardness, developmental delays, and language/speech delay, and epilepsy. Additional findings include generalized cerebral glucose hypometabolism. It has been described in four un-related children.
