= Logorrhea (disambiguation) =

Logorrhea or logorrhoea may refer to:

- Logorrhea, a communication disorder resulting in incoherent talkativeness
- Logorrhea or verbosity, speech or writing which is deemed to use an excess of words
