= Bloviation =

Empty, pompous, political speech

"Americanism really began when it was robed in nationality..." – Warren G. Harding

"America's present need is not heroics but healing; not nostrums but normalcy..." – Warren G. Harding

Bloviation is a style of empty, pompous, political speech. The word originated in Ohio and was most notably used by Warren G. Harding in his successful 1920 US presidential campaign. He subsequently described it as "the art of speaking for as long as the occasion warrants, and saying nothing". His opponent, William Gibbs McAdoo, compared it to "an army of pompous phrases moving over the landscape in search of an idea."

== Origin ==
Bloviation in Ohio was originally idle chatter. As a form of political speech, it appears in the Debates and Proceedings of the Convention for the Revision of the State of Ohio in the mid 19th century. One etymology suggests that the word is a "compound of blow, in its sense of 'to boast' (also in another typical Americanism, blowhard), with a mock-Latin ending to give it the self-important stature implicit in its meaning."

== Gamalielese ==
H. L. Mencken lampooned Harding's bloviate style as gamalielese, from his middle name of Gamaliel. He complained that the style was suited to Ohio yokels:

Addressing such simians, the learned doctor acquired a gift for the sort of discourse that is to their taste. It is a kind of baby talk, a puerile and wind-blown gibberish. In sound it is like a rehearsal by a country band, with only the bass-drummer keeping time. In content it is a vacuum.

In this he was responding to The New York Times which had defended Harding's style as presidential:

Mr. Harding's official style is excellent. Its merits are obvious. In the first place, it is a style that looks Presidential. It contains the long words and big sentences which are expected. ... Furthermore the President's style is one that radiates hopefulness and aspiration. ... In the President's misty language the great majority see a reflection of their own indeterminate thoughts.

== See also ==
- Circumlocution
- Filibuster
- Stilted speech
- Verbiage
