= Asemic =

Asemic may refer to:

- Asemia, a communication disorder
- Asemic writing
