= List of language disorders =

The following is a list of language disorders. A language disorder is a condition defined as a condition that limits or altogether stops natural speech. A language disorder may be neurological, physical, or psychological in origin.

== List of language disorders ==
Feature of speech	Absence of feature	Difficulty	Problem
Phonation	Anarthria	Dysarthria, dysglossia	
Comprehension	Agnosia, asemia, asymbolia		
Speech	Aphasia, aphrasia	Dysphasia, schizophasia, logorrhea	Paraphasia
Intonation	Aprosodia	Dysprosody	
Poverty of speech	Alogia		
Reading (process)	Alexia	Dyslexia	Paralexia
Written language	Agraphia	Dysgraphia, graphorrhea	Paragraphia
Spoken language	Alalia	Dyslalia, coprolalia, echolalia, glossolalia	Palilalia
Recalling names	Anomia	Dysnomia	
Motor disorder	Apraxia	Dyspraxia	
Orthophony		Dysphemia	
Orthography		Dysorthography	
Syntax	Agrammatism		Paragrammatism
Voice	Aphonia	Dysphonia	

== Bibliography ==
- Lahey, Margaret; Bloom, Lois (1988). Language Disorders and Language Development. New York: Macmillan. ISBN 978-0-02-367130-2.
