= Paragrammatism =

- Specialty: Speech language pathology

Paragrammatism is the inability to form grammatically correct sentences, found in certain forms of speech disturbance. It is characteristic of fluent aphasia, and most commonly receptive aphasia. Paragrammatism is sometimes called "extended paraphasia," although it is different from paraphasia. Paragrammatism is roughly synonymous with "word salad," which concerns the semantic coherence of speech rather than its production.

== Cause ==
Huber assumes a disturbance of the sequential organization of sentences as the cause of the syntactic errors (1981:3). Most practitioners regard paragrammatism as the morphosyntactic "leitsymptom" of receptive aphasia.

However, ever since the introduction of the term paragrammatism some students have pointed out that paragrammatic and agrammatic phenomena, which in classical theory form part of Broca's aphasia, may co-occur in a patient.

== History ==
Since Kleist introduced the term in 1916, paragrammatism has denoted a disordered mode of expression characterized by confused and erroneous word order, syntactic structure or grammatical morphology.

Most researchers suppose that the faulty syntactic structure (blends, contaminations, break-offs) results from a disturbance of the syntactic plan of the utterance.

In non-fluent aphasia, oral expression is often agrammatic, i.e. grammatically incomplete or incorrect. By contrast, expression in fluent aphasia usually appears grammatical, albeit with disruptions in content. Despite this persistent impression, errors of sentence structure and morphology occur in fluent aphasia, although they take the form of substitutions rather than omissions.

== See also ==
- Lists of language disorders
