= Circumduction =

Circumduction may refer to:

- Circumduction (anatomy), the circular movement of a limb
- Circumduction (rhetoric), an ambiguous or roundabout figure of speech
