= Graphorrhea =

Disorder of incoherent written rambling

Graphorrhea is a communication disorder involving excessive wordiness, incoherent rambling, or frequent digressions in writing. Graphorrhea is most commonly associated with schizophrenia. However, it can also result from other psychiatric disorders such as aphasia and mania or neurological disorders like temporal lobe epilepsy and brain lesions. The ramblings may be grammatically correct, but still leave the reader confused and unsure what the piece is about.

== Characteristics ==
Graphorrhea can be distinguished in several ways. The patients' writing has a tendency to look 'scrawled' and it does not abide usual grammar regulations. The content produced is, for the most part, meaningless and hard to understand.

In recent years, there have been developments in determining the presence of graphorrhoea. For example, digital phenotyping uses computerized measurement tools to apprehend the characteristics of a psychiatric disorder. In the case of schizophrenia, behavioural symptoms, such as graphorrhea, are being objectified and quantified under 'e-semiotics' (the study of electronic signs and their interpreted meanings). The anticipated result of the new computerized system is that patients with manic episodes will have an easier way to 'write' their thoughts using SMS (short message service). The aim of using these computerised tools to diagnose graphorrhoea is to evaluate the cognitive functions of schizophrenia patients in a more precise manner. The patients' thoughts will appear more ordered and easier to follow as a result, to determine how 'disorganised' they really are and the degree to which the patient is able to communicate through writing.

== Associations with schizophrenia ==
Graphorrhea is a communication disorder that particularly targets the individual's ability to communicate through writing, which is considered a by-product of disorganized speech experienced with schizophrenia.

Common symptoms of schizophrenia include thought disorder, which is related to the presence of graphorrhoea. The inability to structure thoughts renders methods of communication: speech and writing. An example of a disease, where troubles with speech negatively affect writing skill is speech articulation disorder. Its symptoms include incomprehensive speech that impacts the ability of transcription (spelling skills). Transcription is crucial for transforming ideas into language. Language and communication dysfunctions in schizophrenia are usually referred to as a jumbled speech, which affects patients' writing ability making writing unclear and poorly organized.

The pathophysiology of schizophrenia links the disorder with a dysregulation of multiple neural pathways, neurotransmitters damaged by the disease result in failed interactions between different receptors; damage to the dopamine neurotransmitter is commonly observed in schizophrenic patients. This failed interaction between dopamine receptors is associated with poor cognitive task performance affecting the measures of goal maintenance (GM) and the working memory (WM), necessary to produce understandable writing. GM and WM are critical for cognitive control. Goal maintenance is to find which specific actions are needed to enforce a certain outcome. The working memory is crucial for administering these goal-directed behaviours. The information is stored and used in the working memory temporarily, to perform the given task. Damage to either drastically limits cognitive capabilities or produces symptoms of graphorrhea.

=== Treatment of 'graphorrheic' symptoms ===
The issue with negative symptoms of schizophrenia, such as graphorrhoea, is that available schizophrenia treatments tend to ignore them and focus on treating the positive symptoms of the disease. Negative symptoms play a critical role in the cognitive decline seen in schizophrenic individuals. Identifying early signs of schizophrenia will help eradicate further progression of the disease, thus, the recognition of these symptoms becomes more significant.

In terms of current treatment for schizophrenic symptoms related to graphorrhoea, at first instance antipsychotics are offered to the patient and then a course of maintenance therapy. The initial goal of the treatment is to restore patient's 'normal' routine e.g., eating and sleeping. Once a point of stability is reached, maintenance therapy addresses self-care and mood dysfunctions in order to avoid relapse of an acute psychotic episode. Such treatments aim to improve mental well- being of an individual and increase the chances of finding a structure to their thoughts. Organized thoughts will mitigate symptoms of graphorrhea.

== Associations with aphasia ==
Aphasia is a disorder involving diminishing ability to understand and formulate language, which includes a difficulty in communicating through writing (graphorrhea). It is caused by serious brain damage to the left hemisphere, which is responsible for speech and language comprehension.

The specific type of aphasia with similar symptoms to graphorrhea is called jargon aphasia. It is a disorder resulting in produced speech being incoherent to listeners. Inability to communicate through speech is the result of violating grammatical rules or the overuse of invented words. Apparent symptoms of jargon aphasia directly translate into writing and are then classified as graphorrhoea.

A notable early example of graphorrhoea is given below: a 71-year-old ex-physician suffering with aphasia, who, although had adequate speech fluency, his produced speech was incomprehensive, which then translated into jumbled writing. The nature of his speech is clearly demonstrated in the following conversation:

Question: What is this, Doctor G……? (A pen is shown)

Answer: Kind of ateuna is emessage, card.

Question: What do you use it for?

Answer: This is a tape of brouse to make buke deproed in the auria.

On average throughout the conversation only a limited few words were used correctly, whereas the remainder were jargon and lengthy unintelligible sentences. Much like his writing, fluent and abrupt yet appeared to be 'meaningless scribbles', again, with a limited correct use of words.

Likewise, patients of crossed aphasia have displayed severe written language deficits. The difference with crossed aphasia is that it is caused by a right-hemisphere lesion, nonetheless victims still suffer from similar writing complications.

Unlike schizophrenia, the individual's writing ability is most seriously impaired in aphasia. Individuals experience that there is a widely recognised discrepancy between oral and written ability; this discrepancy occurred in around 35% of the individuals and 64% of them demonstrated that their written language ability was worse.

=== Treatment of 'graphorrheic' symptoms ===
To improve aphasic individual's 'graphorrheic' symptoms, the orthographic retraining method using a mobile phone keyboard has appeared effective. The treatment tackled the use mobile phone typing to re-educate single word spelling to patients suffering with severe aphasia. However, the results of the study demonstrated that in fact handwriting better maintained progress made by the patients. Typing simply utilises motor movements and spatial memory of the keys, unlike handwriting which makes use of individual allographs needed to differentiate between each letter. These peripheral skills necessary for handwriting impacted the corrective process of written communication more efficiently, in individuals suffering with aphasia.

== See also ==
- Graphomania
- Hypergraphia
- Lists of language disorders
- Logorrhea
- Schizophasia
- Schizophrenia
- Thought disorder
- Word salad
