= Graphomania =

Obsessive impulse to write

Graphomania (from Ancient Greek: γρᾰ́φειν, gráphein, lit. 'to write'; and μᾰνῐ́ᾱ, maníā, lit. 'madness, frenzy'), also known as scribomania, is an obsessive impulse to write. When used in a specific psychiatric context, it labels a morbid mental condition which results in writing rambling and confused statements, often degenerating into a meaningless succession of words or even nonsense then called graphorrhea (see hypergraphia). The term "graphomania" was used in the early 19th century by Esquirol and later by Eugen Bleuler, becoming more or less common. Graphomania is related to typomania, which is obsessiveness with seeing one's name in publication or with writing for being published, excessive symbolism or typology.

Outside the psychiatric definitions of graphomania and related conditions, the word is used more broadly to label the urge and need to write excessively, professionally or not. Max Nordau, in his attack of what he saw as degenerate art, frequently used the term "graphomania" to label the production of the artists he condemned (most notably Richard Wagner or the French symbolist poets).

In The Book of Laughter and Forgetting (1979), Milan Kundera explains proliferation of non-professional writing as follows:

Graphomania inevitably takes on epidemic proportions when a society develops to the point of creating three basic conditions:

1. An elevated level of general well-being, which allows people to devote themselves to useless activities;
2. A high degree of social atomization and, as a consequence, a general isolation of individuals;
3. The absence of dramatic social changes in the nation's internal life. (From this point of view, it seems to me symptomatic that in France, where practically nothing happens, the percentage of writers is twenty-one times higher than in Israel).

Czesław Miłosz—winner of the Nobel Prize for Literature in 1980—used the term "graphomania" in a context much different than Kundera's. In The Captive Mind (1951), Miłosz wrote that the typical writer in the Eastern Bloc who accepted socialist realism "believes that the by-ways of 'philosophizing' lead to a greater or lesser degree of graphomania. Anyone gripped in the claws of dialectics [the philosophy of dialectical materialism] is forced to admit that the thinking of private philosophers, unsupported by citations [failing to regurgitate Stalinist propaganda], is sheer nonsense."

== In popular culture ==
- In American author Mark Z. Danielewski's 2000 novel House of Leaves, the character Zampanò suffers from graphomania.

== Entopic graphomania ==
Entopic graphomania is a surrealist drawing exercise designed to highlight patterns and meaning in pieces of paper, including newspapers, blank pieces of copy paper, and pages of a book. The process consists of closely examining a page for distinguishing features (folds, creases, blank spaces) and marking them with a writing utensil. These marks are then connected by any type of line (squiggly, straight, dotted, etc.).

== See also ==
- Logorrhea (psychology) – Communication disorder
- Verbosity – Excessive use of words
- Hypergraphia – Psychological condition wherein a person is compelled to write or draw
- Bibliomania – Obsessive–compulsive collection of books
- Graffiti – Drawings and paintings on walls
