= The Early Language Milestone =

- Purpose: measure language delays in children

The Early Language Milestone Scale (The ELM Scale) is one of the tools for detecting and measuring language delays in children. It is one of the first lines in the investigation process in diagnosing the delay, and also one of the tools for monitoring the progression. Because of the high sensitivity, it is used as a language-specific screener in the primary care setting in regard to development and growth. It provides a quick screening-evaluation approach and gives promise for meeting the criticisms directed at most of the other screeners.

== Development ==
In 1990, Coplan and Gleason have developed the ELM scale to standardise the screening tools that evaluate speech and language development in children from birth to 36 months. This was constructed to mitigate the existing problems of language development assessments, namely time-consuming, required specialist training, and impractical for general paediatricians. Hence, this value-added feature to clinical practices enables the ELM scale to evolve as one of the most widely used instruments in early childhood language assessment by 1990s.

The original ELM scale was constructed from normative data based on a cross-sectional sample of children aged 0 to 36 months. This scale initially included 41 milestones, each reflecting typical developmental expectations for early language skills.

In 1993, Coplan and Gleason released the second edition, known as ELM Scale-2, expanding the assessment to 43 items and incorporating a focus on prelinguistic utterances for infants under 12 months.

== Structure ==
The ELM Scale-2 is organised into three primary domains, auditory expressive, auditory receptive, and visual. The organisation of ELM Scale-2 was reflecting from the core clinical framework, which was widely used by speech-language pathologists to distinguish between understanding (receptive) and production (expressive) of language. This binary approach as backbone was also common in other assessment tools, including Sequenced Inventory Communication Development (SICD) and Preschool Language Scale (PLS).

1. Auditory Expressive: examines the production of language and subdivides into
  - Content (e.g. vocalisations; sentence formation)
  - Intelligibility (clarity and coherence of speech)
2. Auditory Receptive: examines the understanding of verbal stimuli
3. Visual: involves gesture imitation and visual tracking

This approach with structured items enables a concise assessment, typically completed within 10 minutes, while covering a broad range of language behaviours. Additionally, this structural design reflects the widely influential conceptual approach, Form-Concept-Use model, developed by Bloom and Lahey in 1978. This theoretical framework breaks down language into 3 domains, Form (syntax and phonology), Content (semantics), and Use (pragmatics), which closely aligns with the focus of auditory expressive, content and intelligibility in the ELM Scale-2.

=== Scoring methods ===
The ELM Scale allows two distinct scoring mechanisms:

1. Pass/Fail: A simple binary method allowing for rapid screening decisions. Each item is marked as either “passed” or “failed” based on caregiver reports or direct observation.
1. Point Scoring: A more detailed approach that yields percentile rankings, standard score equivalents, and age equivalents for each domain as well as a global language score.

This dual-method flexibility provides clinicians with the ability to tailor the tool’s use to different context and needs, as well as easy-to-access by paediatricians and caregivers.

== Clinical practices ==
=== Applications ===
The ELM Scale has had wide-reaching influence in both clinical and research settings. It has inspired the development of newer tools and adaptations to monitor the child language development at different age ranges. Schmitt et al. (2017), for example, have established language benchmarks for comparative developmental milestones, targeting the 3–9 years old. Moreover, Alexandre and colleagues (2020) have designed a validated booklet to track ongoing language development post-screening for children aged 4–6 years old. These derivative tools stemmed from ELM Scale allows a more comprehensive approach to child language development in the field.

=== Utility ===
Findings from a validation study have supported that the ELM Scale is a useful screening tool, particularly for toddlers aged 25–36 months. A comparative study sampled 647 children aged 0–36 months with the ELM Scale demonstrating varying degrees of agreement compared to other assessments such as the SICD. The result indicates low agreement in findings for infants (aged 0–12 months), moderate agreement for 13–24 months, and good agreement for old toddlers aged 25–36 months. These findings support the ELM Scale’s role as an initial screening tool, particularly effective for toddlers aged 13 months and old. However, its sensitivity in predictive power for infants under one year remains limited.

== Contemporary use and adaptations ==
Recent systematic literature reviews emphasise the importance of using the ELM Scale in combination with professional judgement and caregiver input. In clinical practice, practitioners report that simplified tools like the ELM Scale are the most effective when paired with conversations between parents or healthcare provides. This aligns with the interactionist perspective that language development is embedded in social contexts such that natural environments facilitate milestone determinations.

Furthermore, UK-based studies advocate for a more holistic approach, integrating milestone-based scales with broader developmental assessments. This ensures that contextual factors, namely socioeconomic status and bilingualism, are considered in diagnostic decisions.

== Criticism and limitations ==
Despite the clinical value provided, the ELM Scale was criticised for its inconsistency in milestone expectations across different cultures and linguistic contexts. While the standard ELM Scale enables translations and adaptations over 18 languages, it may not always reflect the developmental trajectories of children from diverse backgrounds. For instance, Salehuddin and Mahmud suggested the notable gap in tools tailored for Malay-English bilingual children, seeking for future research to direct more inclusive and locally-adapted approaches for the ELM Scale. Consequently, misclassification or over/under-identification of language delays may occur in multilingual or multicultural populations.

Meanwhile, this variability reflects the limitations of ELM Scale in addressing the ultimate explanations of language developments. As the ELM Scale provides the proximate understanding that observable behaviours, such as gesture imitation and vocalisations, reflect specific milestones, assessment scales often fail to explain the evolutionary function of early communicative behaviours in social bonding or survival abilities.

== See also ==
- Modified Checklist for Autism in Toddlers

Other tests such as Clinical Adaptive Test/Clinical Linguistic and Auditory Milestone Scale (CAT/CLAMS) or MCHAT (available in different languages) are also performed if the results of The ELM Scale become positive or equivocal.
