= Aphonia =

Medical condition leading to loss of voice

- Specialty: Psychiatry; Neurology; Speech-language pathology
- Symptoms: A breathy or whispering voice; no voice at all
- Treatment: Voice rest, drinking water, reduce coughing and throat clearing, no whispering or shouting/screaming

Aphonia is defined as the inability to produce voiced sound. This may result from damage, such as surgery (e.g., thyroidectomy) or a tumor, or can be a result of psychological means.

Aphonia means "no sound.” In other words, a person with this disorder has lost their voice and is unable to communicate vocally.

== Causes ==
Injuries are often the cause of aphonia. Minor injuries can affect the second and third dorsal area in such a manner that the lymph patches concerned with coordination become either atrophic or relatively nonfunctioning. Tracheotomy can also cause aphonia.

Any injury or condition that prevents the vocal cords – the paired bands of muscle tissue positioned over the trachea – from coming together and vibrating will have the potential to make a person unable to speak. When a person prepares to speak, the vocal folds come together over the trachea and vibrate due to the airflow from the lungs. This mechanism produces the sound of the voice. If the vocal folds cannot meet together to vibrate, sound will not be produced. Aphonia can also be caused by, and is often accompanied by, fear.

=== Psychogenic ===
Psychogenic aphonia is often seen in patients with underlying psychological problems. Laryngeal examination will usually show bowed vocal folds that fail to adduct to the midline during phonation. However, the vocal folds will adduct when the patient is asked to cough. Treatment should involve consultation and counseling with a speech pathologist and, if necessary, a psychologist.

In this case, the patient's history and the observed unilateral immobility rules out function aphonia.

== Symptoms ==
Symptoms of non-psychogenic aphonia:

- The inflicted person can only whisper.
- A sore throat
- Coughing
- A constant need to clear the throat

Symptoms of psychogenic aphonia:

- The inflicted person will try to speak but only their lips move, known as mouthing.

== See also ==
- Muteness
- List of language disorders
