= Dyslalia =

Speech disorder

Dyslalia is an antiquated term for the incapacity to produce speech phonetically correctly, with tongue diseases instead of neurological disorders or hearing disorders. Under the ICD-10, Dyslalia is currently coded under F80.0 (Phonological disorder). See speech disorders for information on current classifications and etiologies of phonetically based speech sound disorders.

== See also ==
- Alalia
- Lists of language disorders
- Speech disorder
