= Emotional lateralization =

Asymmetrical representation of emotional control and processing in the brain

Emotional lateralization is the asymmetrical representation of emotional control and processing in the brain. There is evidence for the lateralization of other brain functions as well.

Emotions are complex and involve a variety of physical and cognitive responses, many of which are not well understood. The general purpose of emotions is to produce a specific response to a stimulus. Feelings are the conscious perception of emotions, and when an emotion occurs frequently or continuously this is called a mood. (Note: Lane, p. 16.)

A variety of scientific studies have found lateralization of emotions. FMRI and lesion studies have shown asymmetrical activation of brain regions while thinking of emotions, responding to extreme emotional stimuli, and viewing emotional situations. Processing and production of facial expressions also appear to be asymmetric in nature. Many theories of lateralization have been proposed and some of those specific to emotions. Please keep in mind that most of the information in this article is theoretical and scientists are still trying to understand emotion and emotional lateralization. Also, some of the evidence is contradictory. Many brain regions are interconnected and the input and output of any given region may come from and go to many different regions.

== Theories of lateralization ==
=== Right hemisphere dominance ===
Some variations of right hemisphere dominance are
a) The right hemisphere has more control over emotion than left hemisphere. (Note: Lane, p. 79-80.)
b) The right hemisphere is dominant in emotional expression in a similar way that the left hemisphere is dominant in language.
c) The right hemisphere is dominant in the perception of facial expression, body posture, and prosody.
d) The right hemisphere is important for processing primary emotions such as fear while the left hemisphere is important for preprocessing social emotions. (Note: Lane, p. 332.)

General lesions in the right hemisphere reduce or eliminate electrodermal response (skin conductance response ((SCR)) to emotionally meaningful stimuli while the lesions in the left hemisphere do not show changes in SCR response. (Note: Lane, p. 192.)

Subject SB-2046 had part of his right, prefrontal lobe removed because of cancer. While his IQ and a majority of other normal functions were unharmed, he had severely impaired decision-making skills especially when he had to consider immediate vs. future reward and punishment. His decisions were almost always guided by immediate reward or punishment and disregarded any long-term consequences. Researchers were incapable of conditioning patient SB-2046 to nonverbal stimuli containing emotional meaning (reward or punishment), but were able to condition the patient to verbal stimuli containing emotional meaning.

Most language production and processing occur in the left hemisphere while the majority of the emotional processing and production of emotion in speech occurs in the right hemisphere. Persons with schizophrenia usually have difficulty processing prosody. These patients also show a remarkable increase in lateralization towards the right hemisphere of both emotionally and non-emotional prosody rich speech. Also, a decrease in right-handedness led to an increase in the right hemisphere lateralization. This right hemisphere lateralization extends beyond prosody to many of aspects of language and speech processing in schizophrenic patients.

=== Complementarity specialization ===
The two hemispheres have a complementary specialization for control of different aspects of emotion.
a) Left hemisphere primarily process "positive" emotions and right hemisphere primarily process "negative" emotions. A large portion of regions primarily in the right hemisphere are activated during aversive classical conditioning. (Note: Lane, p. 233-237.)

While this theory seems to hold true for some emotions, this theory is generally considered outdated; however a few examples exist. For example, a study found that when subjects were primed with positive stimuli before hearing a consonant, the left hemisphere was more active than the right hemisphere. In contrast, when subjects were primed with a negative stimulus, the right hemisphere was more active than the left hemisphere.

b) Other divisions of specialization

The amygdala plays a role in the conscious awareness of emotion (feelings) resulting in perception of feeling, but experiments suggest the left and right amygdala have distinct roles in conscious and unconscious processing of emotion. The right amygdala plays a role in the nonconscious processing of emotion while the left amygdala was involved in the processing of conscious emotions. (Note: Lane, p. 321.) These results were obtained from studies that masked conditioning stimuli. Stimuli were presented over a very short period of time such that subjects were not consciously aware of the stimuli but were still able to show physiological changes.

Damage to the left hemisphere in patients results in a marked increase in depression. (Note: Lane, p. 334-339.) Valence asymmetry may be due to more cholinergic and dopaminergic on the left hemisphere and the right hemisphere being more noradrenergic. Patients with right hemisphere damage had reduced arousal response to painful stimuli.

=== Homeostatic basis ===
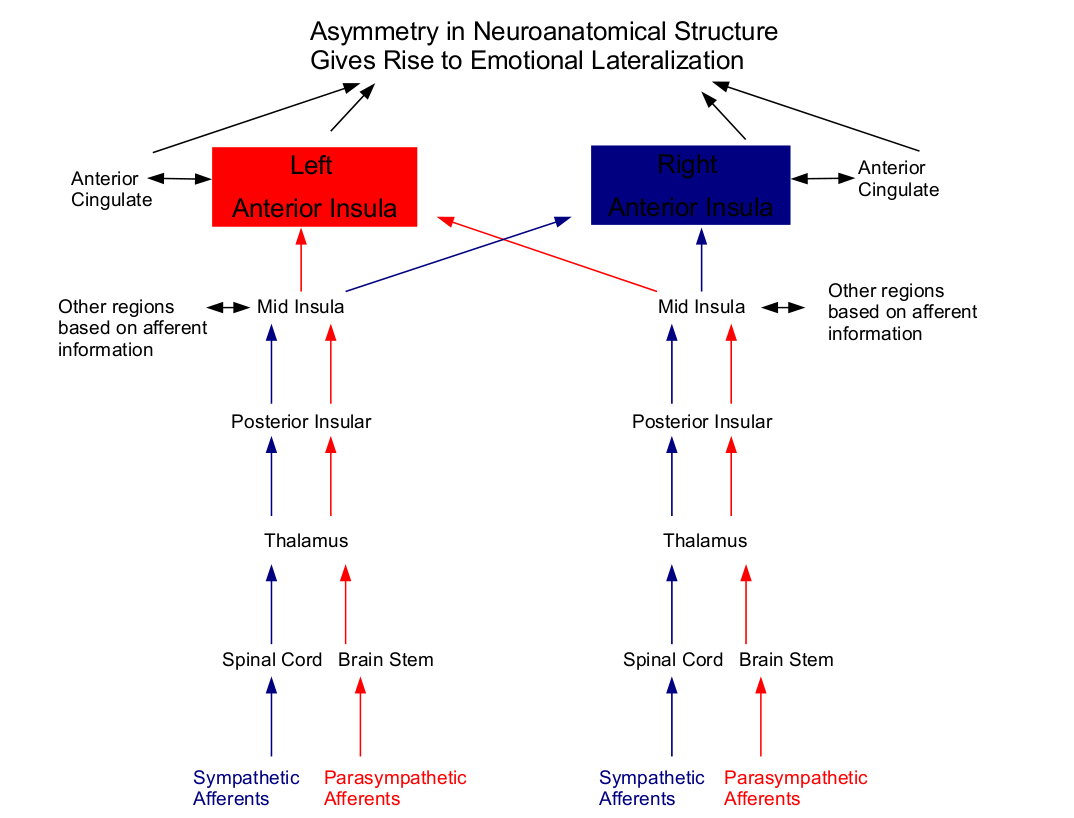
Neuroanatomical basis for emotional lateralization

This model provides a neuroanatomical basis for emotional control and processing. The peripheral autonomic nervous system is not symmetrical. Afferent nerves in the parasympathetic and sympathetic systems of the autonomic nervous system differently innervate various organs that maintain homeostasis such as the heart and the face. The asymmetrical representation of the autonomic peripheral nervous system leads to the asymmetrical representation in the brain. The left hemisphere is activated predominantly by homeostatic afferents associated with parasympathetic functions and the right hemisphere is activated predominantly by homeostatic afferents associated with sympathetic functions. The lateralization is extremely apparent in the anterior cingulate cortex (ACC) and anterior insular cortex (AI) associated with higher emotions such as romantic love and motivation correlated with homeostatic functions. The left AI and ACC are more active during feelings of romantic love and maternal attachment. The AI and ACC were activated on both the right and left sides while watching pain being inflicted on a loved one while only the right AI and ACC that is elicited during subjective feelings of pain; this supports the association of right AI in aroused ('sympathetic') feelings and left AI in affiliative ('parasympathetic') feelings.

Particularly, cardiovascular function appears to be lateralized and tied to emotional stress. Intense emotional stimuli that cause stress can lead to alterations in cardiovascular function. The right insular cortex probably plays the most significant role in these phenomena. Similar lateralization is probably involved in cardiovascular malfunction in patients with head injury, stroke, multiple sclerosis, brain tumors, meningitis and encephalitis, migraine, cluster headache and neurosurgical procedures.

=== Lateralization due to lateralization of other functions ===
"It is unlikely that the brain evolved an asymmetrical control of emotional behavior. Rather, it seems more likely that although there may be some asymmetry in the neural control of emotion, the observed asymmetries are largely a product of the asymmetrical control of other functions such as the control of movement, language, or the processing of complex sensory information," Lateralization may have been evolutionarily adaptive. Lateralization may allow for a greater variety of emotions. The left temporal cortex is involved in language processing while the right temporal cortex is involved in processing faces. This lateralization is also apparent when processing emotions.

=== Lateralization and sex differences ===
There may be a difference in cortical activation between men and women. Activity in the right hemisphere was greater in women when exposed to unpleasant images than men, though men showed more activation bilaterally while viewing pleasant pictures. (Note: Lane, p. 261.) Another study found that women but not men, with women had greater activation of their right hemisphere while viewing unpleasant faces and left hemisphere activation while viewing pleasant faces. Yet, another study found contrasting sex difference while recording EEG waves in the parietal and frontal lobes. Negative pictures activated the left hemisphere in women more than in men, and the right hemisphere in men more than in women when shown unpleasant images.

== Evidence of lateralization ==
The vast majority of the data comes from functional imaging, skin conductance response (SCR), standardized tests ranging from cognitive (e.g. IQ tests) to emotional intelligence, and subjective questionnaires such as those rating how fearful or happy faces look. All the tests have their strengths and weakness (see "Limitation of Studies" below). This section primarily focuses on results on the more subjective observations and results that have unknown neural basis or regions.

=== Behavioral differences and cortical activation ===
70% of right handed patients show preference in viewing emotion expressed on the right side of the face (in the left field of view) according to studies using chimeric faces produced using right-right or left-left mirrored faces. The left side of the face seems more fluent in expressing emotions which means the right cortical hemisphere is more fluent in expressing emotions. (Note: Lane, p. 71-73.) Handedness does not appear to affect the processing associated with viewing facial expressions.

Situations that contradict moral teachings generally produce negative emotions. Watching people behave badly by breaking moral codes most significantly activates the right parahippocampal gyrus, the right medial frontal gyrus, and left amygdala. Watching emotionally negative situations most significantly activates the right amygdala. This study indicates that lateral processing of emotions extends beyond the basic emotions to higher cognitive responses.

Depression or having previously been depressed probably is due to altered brain structure or alters brain structure. Patients who have been depressed or are depressed show more activation to negative stimuli in emotion. When negative stimuli were presented to patients' right hemispheres, the patients were significantly more accurate and quicker to respond to the stimuli. The data in this study shows that psychological disorders are correlated with increased lateralization.

=== Facial expressions of emotion ===
Patients with damage to their left amygdala lesions rated fearful faces less fearful than normal subjects. (Note: Lane, p. 228-230) Similar findings showed that regional blood flow increased in response to fear faces while decreased to euphoric faces in the left amygdala.

Chimpanzees, other primates, and humans produce asymmetrical facial expressions with greater expression on the left side of the face (right hemisphere of the brain). Researchers also subjectively reported that the left side of the face was expressing more emotion using images of left-left chimeric faces.

=== Notable lateralized brain structures and regions ===
Emotion is processed in many different areas of the brain, and a specific emotion may be processed in multiple areas. Regions involved in emotional lateralization appear to follow the general conventions that describe the roles/functions of certain brain regions. Below are a few regions and structure involved in emotional processing that show functional lateralization.

==== Frontal lobe ====
Using a PET scan, researchers found that activity in the left medial and lateral prefrontal cortex was reciprocally associated with decrease activity in the amygdala. These findings imply that the prefrontal cortex modulates the amygdala activity. The left prefrontal cortex plays a role in approach behaviors (positively valenced emotions), while the amygdala plays a role in withdrawal behaviors (negatively valenced emotions). (Note: Lane, p. 383)

The superior frontal gyrus is the most significantly activated region while processing sadness.

Patients with inferior frontal lobe damage produce less and less intense facial expression when presented with emotional stimuli, and they also have problems reading fear and disgust in other people. People with left inferior frontal lobe damage produced less facial expression and could not analyze emotional situations as well as those with right frontal lobe damage especially with fear and disgust. The left inferior frontal gyrus (IFG) plays an important role in anger while the right IFG plays a larger role in disgust.

Patients with dorsolateral frontal cortex lesions have difficulty discerning propositional attitude. Patients with left lesions show further increased impairment.

==== Parietal lobe ====
Damage to the inferior parietal region including the anterior (supramarginal gyrus) and posterior (angular gyrus) regions resulted in reduced SCR. Damage to the right hemisphere in these regions resulted in a significant (p < 0.001) decrease in SCR while the damage to the left hemisphere of these regions did not (p > 0.05). (Note: Lane, p. 192-195.)

==== Temporal lobe ====
The right superior temporal gyrus was the most significantly activated area during the processing happiness. The right superior temporal gyrus increasingly responds to an increasingly happy stimuli, while the left pulvinar increasingly responds to increasingly fearful stimuli. The right pulvinar is activated during aversive conditioning.

==== Amygdala ====
The amygdala plays a key role in emotional processing especially fear, and amygdala function appears to be emotionally lateralized. When people are shown fearful faces the left amygdala and left periamygdaloid cortex increase in activation. There also appears to be a greater increase in neural activity in the left amygdala corresponding to an increasingly fearful stimulus. Recordings from single-unit electrodes in monkeys have shown similar activation in the left amygdala. (Note: Lane, p. 117-120.) A man with confined damage in the right amygdala could not produce a startle response. The activity (measured by a PET scan) in the right amygdala correlated to the number of emotionally arousing film clips capable of being recalled in patients.

Unilateral activation of the amygdala due to fearful stimuli may also produce unilateral activation of other regions. The right middle temporal gyrus, right brainstem, left hippocampus, right cerebellum, right fusiform gyrus, and left lingual gyrus were also activated during fearful stimuli. Activation of multiple brain regions both indicates that emotions are processed in many parts of the brain and that emotions are complex.

The amygdala probably plays a role in the conscious processing of emotion. The left amygdala was activated during the processing of conscious stimuli while the right amygdala was active during the processing of nonconscious stimuli. (Note: Lane, p. 359-361.)

==== Anterior cingulate cortex (ACC) ====
The anterior cingulate cortex (ACC) plays a role in a variety of functions including emotional ones. The ACC may be important in conscious awareness of emotion. Damage to the ACC is associated with decreased SCR to physical and psychological stimuli. Bilateral and unilateral damage both resulted in decreased SCR indicates that the right and left ACC's may specialized in certain aspects of emotional response.

==== Anterior insula (AI) ====
The left anterior insula (AI) increasingly responds to increasingly fearful stimuli. The AI may also be involved in the conscious experience of emotion.

== Implications ==
Phenomena such as emotional lateralization may help describe how emotions arise, persist, and alter our behavior. Understanding emotional lateralization will help scientists understand emotion in general. Emotional lateralization may also play a role in psychological disorders such as depression and schizophrenia. Future treatment of psychological disorders may have more targeted neurological treatments rather than ingested drugs.

Symptoms that arise from confined regions of damage usually have stereotypical emotional and behavioral changes. Diagnosis for locating damaged regions that process emotion may aided by noticeable emotional changes categorized under one of the lateralized emotional control systems. Diagnosis and treatment for cardiovascular irregularities that arises from emotions states could be aided by understanding the physical basis of the psychological influences. Instead of treating the cardiovascular irregularities for psychological issues, treatment could target the lateralized brain regions.

== Limitation of Studies ==
Like all human based scientific experiments there are limitations to what researchers can do. Attempting to study emotions is especially hard since emotions are complex and can lead to subjective response. Since the majority of experiments in emotional lateralization have been on fear this leaves the question of whether other emotions are also lateralized. Below are two major issues associated with many of the experiments studying emotion that require further explanation.

=== Sample size ===
A large percent of the human studies are of anomalies due to accidents, tumors, or attempts to cure disease (e.g. seizures) using lesioning. Since very few such cases exist the sample size of human studies of emotional lateralization are generally very limited and may be as small as single person. While these studies may provide a good insight into certain brain regions and their functions their conclusions are not definite. Animal studies may help in understanding this problem but emotions in humans are generally considered more complicated than in most animals.

=== Functional imaging ===
There are several limitations when using fMRI or PET to study emotional responses. Because fMRI measures changes in blood oxygenation, using the BOLD effect, its temporal resolution is limited by the haemodynamic response to several seconds. PET has similar limits, offering slightly better temporal resolution and slightly worse spatial resolution.

=== Lesioning ===
Lesions rarely are localized and can affect large areas of the brain. Processing in the brain is generally not localized and requires many areas of the brain to process. Furthermore, lesioning may interfere with pathways that span the lesion site. Thus, lesions are not always a good way to determine what specific brain areas do. Therefore, a degree of skepticism should be kept in mind when viewing lateralization data from lesion studies.
