= Agrammatism =

Non-fluent aphasia

Agrammatism is a characteristic of non-fluent aphasia. Individuals with agrammatism present with speech that is characterized by containing mainly content words, with a lack of function words. For example, when asked to describe a picture of children playing in the park, the affected individual responds with, "trees... children... run." People with agrammatism may have telegraphic speech, a unique speech pattern with simplified formation of sentences (in which many or all function words are omitted), akin to that found in telegraph messages. Deficits in agrammaticism are often language-specific, however—in other words, "agrammaticism" in speakers of one language may present differently from in speakers of another.

Errors made in agrammatism depend on the severity of aphasia. In severe forms language production is severely telegraphic and in more mild to moderate cases necessary elements for sentence construction are missing. Common errors include errors in tense, number, and gender. Patients also find it very hard to produce sentences involving "movement" of elements, such as passive sentences, wh-questions or complex sentences.

Agrammatism is seen in many brain disease syndromes, including expressive aphasia and traumatic brain injury.

== Verb Inflection ==
Verb inflection for tense has been found to be problematic in several languages. Scholars have proposed a variety of theories to explain it:

- Tree Pruning Hypothesis (TPH): a hypothesis that the ability to alter tense (pruning the tense node) has cascading ramifications on grammatical agreement. (Note: Other affected constructions include wh-questions, embedded clauses, and complementizer phrases.) The hypothesis arose in 1997 from the study of Hebrew, Arabic, and English and was also applied to the Ibero-Romance languages (i.e., Catalan, Galician, and Castilian).
- Tense Underspecification Hypothesis (TUH): a hypothesis which states that tense and inflection (T/INFL), the syntactic site of both tense and grammatical mood, lacks tense specification in agrammatic speech. It was introduced in 2004 for German.
- Tense and Agreement Underspecification Hypothesis (TAUH): a hypothesis that It was also introduced based on studies of German.
- Diacritical Encoding and Retrieval Hypothesis: the hypothesis that morphosemantic factors are the site of agrammatic deficits and that diacritic tense features are affected in English agrammatism.

Bastiaanse (2008) did not find such dissociation for Dutch but rather that reference to the past is more impaired regardless of verb inflection or agreement. Her research found that finite verbs are more difficult than non-finite verbs, but both within the finite verbs and within the nonfinite verbs, the forms referring to the past (third person singular past tense and participle respectively) are more difficult than their counterparts referring to the present (third person singular present tense and infinitives). None of the hypotheses on verb forms aforementioned (TPH, TUH, and TAUH) can account for these results, since participles in Dutch are not inflected for tense and agreement nor do they check their features in the left periphery. Similar findings have been also reported for Greek and for English respectively in a re-analysis of Nanousi et al.'s (2006) and Lee et al.'s (2008) data, and also for Turkish in Yarbay, Duman & Bastiaanse (2009). In any case, Bastiaanse concluded in 2008 that an additional hypothesis expressing that agrammatic speakers have difficulty making reference to the past was needed. Simultaneously, she proposed two possible answers: (a) it could be that representations of events in the past are semantically more complex, possibly because there are two time periods of relevance and (b) it might also be the case that it is not so much reference to the past as such that is difficult for agrammatic speakers, but to express this reference by verb inflection.

== History ==
Agrammatism was first coined by Adolf Kussmaul in 1887 to explain the inability to form words grammatically and to syntactically order them into a sentence. Later on, Harold Goodglass defined the term as the omission of connective words, auxiliaries and inflectional morphemes, all of these generating a speech production with extremely rudimentary grammar. Agrammatism, today seen as a symptom of the Broca's syndrome, has been also referred as 'motor aphasia', 'syntactic aphasia', 'efferent motor aphasia', and 'non-fluent aphasia'.

The early accounts of agrammatism involved cases of German and French participants. The greater sophistication of the German school of aphasiology at the turn of the 20th century and also the fact that both German and French are highly inflected languages, might have been triggers for that situation. Nowadays, the image has slightly changed: grammatical impairment has been found to be selective rather than complete, and a cross-linguistic perspective under the framework of Universal Grammar (UG) together with a shift from morphosyntax to morphosemantics is à la page. Now the focus of study in agrammatism embraces all natural languages and the idiosyncrasies scholars think a specific language has are put in relation to other languages so as to better understand agrammatism, help its treatment, and review and advance in the field of theoretical linguistics.

Aphasia in Catalan language speakers was first explored in a general sense (focused on lesion localization or rehabilitation of agrammatic patients) in the 1990s. Later studies included case studies, and one of the most recent works on the subject adheres to the Tree Pruning Hypothesis described by Friedmann and Grodzinsky (2007). The Tree Pruning hypothesis is no longer preferred in the field since the findings in Bastiaanse (2008) were supported by a re-analysis of data from Nanousi et al. (2006) and Lee et al. (2008), and the work of Yarbay Duman & Bastiaanse (2009). Other, more recent work for agrammatism in Catalan should be found in Martínez-Ferreiro et Gavarró (2007), in Gavarró (2008, 2003a, 2003b, 2002), Balaguer et al. (2004), in Peña-Casanova et al. (2001), and in Sánchez-Casas (2001).

From a cross-linguistic perspective under the framework of Universal Grammar (UG), grammatical impairment in agrammatism has been found to be selective rather than complete. Under this line of thought, the impairment in tense production for agrammatic speakers is currently being approached in different natural languages by means of the study of verb inflection for tense in contrast to agreement (a morphosyntactic approach) and also, more recently, by means of the study of time reference (which, in a sense, should be seen closer to morphosemantics). The type of studies this paper should be related with are those dealing with tense impairment under the framework of time reference. Prior to explaining that, to help understand the goals of such research, it is good to give a taste of the shift from morphosyntax to morphosemantics the study of agrammatism is undergoing. (Note: This paragraph is almost certainly plagiarized, but it is unclear from where.)

Early descriptions of agrammatism were based on patients with lesions in the left frontal lobe, primarily in European languages such as German and French.Grodzinsky, Y. (2000). Classic studies by Goodglass and colleagues documented the telegraphic speech and omission of function words observed in these patients.Goodglass, H., et al. (1964). Over time, research expanded to multiple languages, indicating that grammatical deficits are influenced by the structural properties of each language, rather than representing a universal loss of grammar.

== Neurological Basis ==
Historically, agrammatism was associated with damage to Broca’s area, located in the left inferior frontal gyrus. Modern neuroimaging studies, however, indicate that deficits arise from disruption across a broader left-hemisphere language network, including the premotor cortex, insula, and subcortical regions.Dronkers, N., et al. (2007). Functional and structural imaging suggest that impairments in grammatical encoding are linked to reduced connectivity between frontal and temporal regions.Friederici, A. (2011). These findings support a network-based model of language processing, in which syntactic and morphological computations depend on interactions among distributed brain regions.Wilson, S., & Saygin, A. (2004).

== Symptoms and Linguistic Characteristics ==
Agrammatism is a type of aphasia characterized by reduced and simplified grammatical structures, often referred to as “telegraphic speech” because sentences primarily contain content words with few function words or inflections.Goodglass, H., et al. (1964). Individuals typically omit tense markers, subject-verb agreement, and auxiliary verbs, producing short, non-hierarchical phrases.Dick, F., Bates, E., Wulfeck, B., et al. (2001). Despite these morphosyntactic deficits, semantic comprehension often remains relatively preserved, allowing patients to understand meaning and attempt self-correction.Grodzinsky, Y. (2000). Certain sentence types, such as passive constructions and object-relative clauses, are especially challenging for individuals with agrammatism. Cross-linguistic studies indicate that the manifestations of agrammatism vary depending on the grammatical properties of the language, though the selective impairment of morphosyntactic processing appears consistent.Bastiaanse, R., & Thompson, C. (2012).

In addition to these core characteristics, patients with agrammatism may experience difficulty understanding complex sentences under time pressure or within extended discourse, highlighting the interplay between grammatical processing and working memory.Dick, F., Bates, E., Wulfeck, B., et al. (2001). Research also shows that repeated practice and targeted therapy focused on specific grammatical structures can improve both sentence production and comprehension, suggesting that morphosyntactic abilities can be partially retrained.Bastiaanse, R., & Thompson, C. (2012). These findings emphasize the importance of careful clinical assessment and structured rehabilitation to address the selective grammatical deficits characteristic of agrammatic aphasia.

== Theoretical Accounts ==
Several frameworks have been proposed to explain agrammatic impairments:

- Syntactic pruning and morphosyntactic access: Friedmann & Grodzinsky (1997) argue that agrammatism arises from impaired access to higher functional nodes in the syntactic tree, explaining difficulties with tense, agreement, and complex sentence forms.
- Distributed model of language breakdown: Dick et al. (2001) propose that grammatical deficits result from distributed disruptions across language-related brain regions, rather than a single localized area.
- Neurolinguistic network perspective: Evidence from neuroimaging supports the view that syntactic and morphological processing relies on interactions among multiple frontal and temporal areas.

== Assessment and Treatment ==
Agrammatism is typically evaluated using standardized aphasia batteries that measure sentence production and comprehension.Code, C. (1991). Clinicians often assess patients with sentence repetition, picture description, and grammaticality judgment tasks, examining errors in function word use, tense, and agreement.Bastiaanse, R., & Thompson, C. (2012). Performance on these tasks can identify the specific morphosyntactic deficits characteristic of agrammatism.Friedmann, N., & Grodzinsky, Y. (1997).

Treatment approaches for agrammatism focus on restoring or compensating for impaired grammatical processing. Structured therapies aim to improve sentence production by practicing increasingly complex constructions.Code, C. (1991). Evidence suggests that targeting specific morphosyntactic features, such as tense and agreement, can produce measurable improvements in expressive language.Dick, F., Bates, E., Wulfeck, B., et al. (2001); Bastiaanse, R., & Thompson, C. (2012). Approaches grounded in network-based models emphasize intensive practice and reinforcement of distributed language circuits to enhance syntactic processing.Friederici, A. (2011); Wilson, S., & Saygin, A. (2004).

Summary of Agrammatism Characteristics and Treatment
| Category | Description | References |
|---|---|---|
| Speech Production | Reduced grammatical structures; telegraphic speech; omission of tense, agreement, auxiliary verbs | |
| Sentence Types Affected | Passive constructions, object-relative clauses, wh-questions | |
| Comprehension | Semantic comprehension relatively preserved; difficulty under time pressure or complex discourse | |
| Cross-Linguistic Variation | Manifestations vary by language; rich morphology vs classifier languages; core morphosyntactic impairment consistent | |
| Neurological Basis | Lesions in left inferior frontal gyrus (Broca’s area), premotor cortex, insula, subcortical regions; network-level disruption | |
| Treatment | Targeted therapy on grammatical structures; repeated practice improves production and comprehension | |

== See also ==
- Lists of language disorders
