= Aprosodia =

Inability to properly convey or interpret prosody

Aprosodia is a neurological condition characterized by the inability of a person to properly convey or interpret emotional prosody. Prosody in language refers to the ranges of rhythm, pitch, stress, intonation, etc. These neurological deficits can be the result of damage of some form to the non-dominant hemisphere areas of language production. The prevalence of aprosodias in individuals is currently unknown, as testing for aprosodia secondary to other brain injury is only a recent occurrence.

== Types ==
=== Productive ===
- Motor aprosodia is characterised by the physical inability of a patient to produce or imitate emotional indicators, with vocal inflection (volume and pitch changes) and facial gesturing being the most frequently impaired functions and with damage to the motor area of the brain being the most frequent cause of impairment. Persons exhibiting only a motor aprosodia are able to understand the affective aspects of others' spoken communication but are physically unable to respond in kind.
- Expressive aprosodia occurs when cognitive limitations rather than (or in addition to) motor-skill limitations render an individual unable to properly produce cues reflecting an intended emotional message.

=== Receptive ===
Receptive aprosodia can result from impairment at one or more sensory and/or cognitive levels ranging from hearing (signal acquisition) to auditory processing (signal isolation) to emotional comprehension (signal interpretation). For example, the first two difficulties impair an individual's ability to observe and discern changes in stress and intonation, whereas the third impairs an individual's ability to assess the significance of those stress and intonation changes that he or she correctly observes and discerns; impairment of the third type correlates significantly with expressive aprosodia.

== Causes ==
=== Localized brain damage ===
One cause of aprosodia is trauma to one of several specific areas of the brain, resulting in the inability to properly process or convey emotional cues. This brain damage can occur in the form of ischemic damage from stroke.

=== Alcohol use disorder ===
An inability to process or exhibit emotions in a proper manner has been shown to exist in people who consume excessive amounts of alcohol and those who were exposed to alcohol while fetuses (FAexp). Initially, when people with an alcohol use disorder are detoxified and FAexp individuals were tested for impairment in cognitive function, it was limited to testing the non-affective aspects of language, as those were the more easily recognized by a physician not trained in analyzing affective prosody. When tested using the aprosodia battery, it was found that those with alcohol use disorder who detoxified and FAexp individuals demonstrated significant impairment in their ability to detect affective prosody when used by others. The major factors which influence affective prosody in those impacted by alcohol use, from greatest to least impact, are: alcohol use by mother, age at onset of chronic abuse of alcohol, age at initial abuse, how chronic the abuse is, and the age when a person first becomes drunk.

=== Aprosodia as a symptom ===
Aprosodia has also been shown to appear secondary to several diseases such as multiple sclerosis or post traumatic stress disorder. It is likely that as time passes more diseases will be shown to exhibit aprosodia as a symptom. Aprosodia is a condition that was not often tested for in the presence of neurological deficits; however, as more becomes known about it, the aprosodia battery will likely be administered more frequently. For example, the first study testing for aprosodia in MS did not occur until 2009.

== Diagnosis ==
=== Emotional batteries ===
Emotional batteries consist of asking patients to read various sentences with specific emotional indicators. Their performance is subjectively analyzed by an expert to determine if they are aprosodic. The analysis is often performed by two experts independently, with one of the judges not being present during the interview in case the patient was still able to use facial cues.

=== Assessment questionnaire ===
Another method implemented to test for aprosodia involves having questionnaires filled out by those close to the patient. The doctors and nurses taking care of a patient are also requested to fill out a questionnaire if aprosodia is suspected. This diagnosis method occurs more as an indicator that the aprosodia battery should be administered rather than being used as a singular diagnosis tool. Implementation of the questionnaire is expected to become more widespread as aprosodia is revealed to be a side-effect of more diseases.

=== Aprosodia vs. dysprosody ===
Brain imaging studies related to speech functions have yielded insights into the subtle difference between aprosodia and dysprosody. The major differences in these result from functions which are characterized as belonging mainly to the left or right hemisphere. Several of the functions have been described as dominant and lateralized functions of the corresponding hemispheres, while some have been found to arise from communication between the two hemispheres.

== Treatment ==
The two main forms of treatment are cognition based and imitation based. Cognitive treatments attempt to rebuild the "emotional toolbox" of those with aprosodia. The basis for this treatment is the belief that there exists a defined set of emotional responses that can be chosen for a given scenario. Choosing the proper emotional response can very much be likened to choosing the proper word when describing an object, and this deficiency can be likened to Broca's Aphasia but for emotions. Imitative treatments attempt to help "kickstart" the motor systems involved in the production of both vocal and facial emotive gestures. The basis for this treatment is the belief that the pathways responsible for the motor elements of expressive prosody were damaged. It is hypothesized that the motor damage occurs at the level of planning as well as the level of execution.

The methods of treatment are being evaluated and changed through several iterations to reach the most beneficial treatment for those with aprosodia. Although the biggest limitation on progress of aprosodia treatment is sample size, some significant data has been found to influence each subsequent phase of study. The Rosenbek lab at the University of Florida is currently in a new phase of treatment study based on combinations of the cognitive-linguistic and imitative therapies delivered in a randomized fashion in an effort to gain more insight into what most prominently affects aprosodia treatment.

== Research ==
Research into the perisylvan region of the right hemisphere has shown that there are similarly mapped analogues to the speech center in the left hemisphere. This is especially evident in those areas resembling Broca's area and Wernicke's area.

Additionally, in studying the brain regions associated with aprosodia, brain imaging tests were performed to determine if aprosodia is both a lateralized and dominant function of the right hemisphere areas of language production. Aprosodia can be considered a dominant function of the right hemisphere because strong correlation was found between deficits in affective prosody and distribution of lesions in the cortices of those with right brain damage. No correlation was found between the distribution of cortical lesions in patients with left brain damage and the types of aphasic deficits pronounced in those patients. Aprosodia can be considered a lateralized function of the right hemisphere because of the differences in the ability of a patient to respond to affective prosodic information in those with left brain damage when compared to those with right brain damage. Patients with affective-prosodic deficits in the left hemisphere (dysprosodic patients) showed improvement in understanding and repeating prosodic information when other conveyed linguistic information was simplified, i.e. requiring the patient to mainly determine prosodic information contained in an interaction. This improvement in processing affective prosodic information under reduced linguistic processing demands did not occur for patients with right brain damage.

== See also ==
- Affect
- Aphasia
- Dysprosody
- Lists of language disorders
- Prosody
