= Dysprosody =

Neurological disorder

Dysprosody, which may manifest as pseudo-foreign accent syndrome, is a speech disorder in which one or more of the prosodic functions are either compromised or eliminated.

Prosody refers to the variations in melody, intonation, pauses, stresses, intensity, vocal quality, and accents of speech. As a result, prosody has a wide array of functions, including expression on linguistic, attitudinal, pragmatic, affective and personal levels of speech. People diagnosed with dysprosody most commonly experience difficulties in pitch or timing control. People diagnosed with the condition can comprehend language and vocalize what they intend to say, however, they are not able to control the way in which the words come out of their mouths. Since dysprosody is the rarest neurological speech disorder discovered, not much is conclusively known or understood about the disorder. The most obvious expression of dysprosody is when a person starts speaking in an accent which is not their own. Speaking in a foreign accent is only one type of dysprosody, as the condition can also manifest itself in other ways, such as changes in pitch, volume, and rhythm of speech. It is still very unclear as to how damage to the brain causes the disruption of prosodic function. The only form of effective treatment developed for dysprosody is speech therapy.

== Signs and symptoms ==
Dysprosody is "characterized by alterations in intensity, in the timing of utterance segments, and in rhythm, cadency, and intonation of words." These differences cause a person to lose the characteristics of their particular individual speech. While the individual's personality, sensory comprehension, motor skills, and intelligence all remain intact, their grammar as well as vocal emotional capacity can be affected. Prosodic control is essential to speech delivery because it establishes vocal identity, since each individual's voice has unique characteristics. There are two types of dysprosody, linguistic and emotional, that each present with slightly different symptoms. It is possible that one can present with both forms of dysprosody.

=== Linguistic dysprosody ===
Dysprosody works on a linguistic level in that it specifies the intent of one's speech. For example, prosody is responsible for verbal variations in interrogative versus declarative statements and serious versus sarcastic remarks. Linguistic dysprosody refers to the diminished ability to verbally convey aspects of sentence structure, such as placing stress on certain words for emphasis or using patterns of intonation to reveal the structure or intention of an utterance. For example, individuals with linguistic dysprosody may have difficulty distinguishing the production of interrogative and declarative sentences, switching or leaving out the expected rising and falling shift, respectively. Thus, linguistic dysprosody alters an individual's vocal identity and impairs verbal communication.

=== Emotional dysprosody ===
Emotional dysprosody deals with a person's ability to express emotions through their speech as well as their ability to understand emotion in someone else's speech. Whenever we speak, whether we realize it or not, there are nonverbal aspects of our speech that reveal information about our feelings and attitude. There has been strong evidence that dysprosody does affect the ability to express emotion, however the severity may vary depending on what part of the brain has been damaged. Studies have shown that the ability to express emotional information is dependent on motor, perceptual, and neurobehavioral functions all working together in a specific way. A person with dysprosody would not be able to accurately convey emotion vocally, such as through pitch or melody, or make any conclusion about another person's feeling through his speech. Regardless of the inability to vocally express feeling through prosodic controls, emotions are still formed and felt by the individual. Since there are many different factors which contribute to emotional understanding of speech, it makes it much more complicated to understand.

=== Related symptoms ===
After experiencing brain injury, some people may begin speaking in an accent not native to their country of origin, as discussed in the preceding sections, but more common forms of dysprosody consist of alterations in vocal pitch, timing, rhythm, and control, not necessarily resulting in a foreign-sounding accent. In addition, there have been some cases in which seizures began to develop in patients with dysprosody, but no decisive conclusions connecting dysprosody and seizure activity have been made. Dysprosody can last for differing durations, from a few months to years, although the reason seems to be unclear.

There are several different types of dysprosody which have been classified. The most common types of dysprosody are associated with dysarthria and developmental coordination disorder, which affect motor processing in speech. Among the most studied types are:

- Flaccid dysarthria is characterized by little control over pitch and voice volume, reduced speech rate, and impaired voice quality
- Hypokinetic dysarthria is characterized by harsh voice quality, monotone, reduced volume and breathiness
- Ataxic dysarthria is characterized by harsh voice quality, reduced speech rate, and poor volume and pitch control
- Developmental verbal dyspraxia is characterized by monotone and poor volume control

There can also be some emotional and mental side effects to dysprosody. Each individual has a distinct voice characterized by all the prosodic elements. Once a person loses control of the timing, pitch, melody, etc. of his speech, he can also feel a sense of loss of personal identity, which can sometimes lead to depression.

== Causes ==
Dysprosody is usually attributed to neurological damage, such as brain tumors, brain trauma, brain vascular damage, stroke and severe head injury. To better understand the causes of the condition, 25 cases of dysprosody diagnosed between 1907 and 1978 were examined more closely. It was found that the majority developed dysprosody after a cerebrovascular accident, while another 6 cases developed after a head trauma. In that same study, 16 of the patients were female, while 9 were male. However, there has been no conclusive evidence that gender affects the onset of dysprosody. There has been no evidence that ethnicity, age, or genetics has any impact on the development of dysprosody.

In another reported case in 2004, a patient presented with dysprosody under interesting circumstances. The patient underwent surgery to correct a Reinke's edema, which originates in the vocal folds of the larynx. After the surgery, however, she began speaking in a foreign German accent. Neurological examinations were carried out on the patient through magnetic resonance imaging, but the results were completely normal. The only conclusion the doctors could make was that the surgery somehow changed the patient's vocal identification causing the new voice pattern. It was possible that the patient had a lack of oxygen to the brain during the surgery, which would have gone undetected by the resonance imaging, causing dysprosody. Although most causes of dysprosody are due to neurological damage, this case study shows that there can be other causes which are not necessarily neurologically based.

== Diagnosis ==
When studies of dysprosody first began, diagnosis involved an untrained ear determining impairments in the prosodic elements. However, over time and as dysprosody has been studied more closely, a more concrete method of diagnosis has been developed. One diagnosis technique is a rating scale, such as the Boston Diagnostic Aphasia Examination. The exam is a subjective rating system of volume (from loud to normal to soft), voice (from normal to whisper to hoarse), speech rate (from fast to normal to slow) and intonation which is rated on a scale from 1–7. One indicates no sentence intonation, four is given when sentence intonation is limited to abrupt pauses, and seven indicates normal intonation.

There are also more involved diagnostic evaluations for which contain both productive and comprehensive parts. In the productive part, the patient is asked to say sentences with certain instructions. In the comprehension section, the patient is asked to listen to sentences being said and then answer questions about how they were stated. In order to determine linguistic dysprosody, a patient is asked to read sentences that can either be a statement or a question using both declarative and interrogative intonations. How the patient uses prosodic contours to distinguish between asking a question and saying a statement is recorded. During the comprehension section of the evaluation, a clinician reads simple sentences with either a declarative or interrogative intonation and the patient is asked to identify whether the sentence is a question or a statement. Evaluation of these two parts can determine if the patient has linguistic dysprosody. Emotional dysprosody can be diagnosed by having a patient state a neutral sentence with different emotions, such as happy, sad, and angry. Patients with dysprosody will not be able to convey the emotions very well or differentiate their speech between the different emotions significantly. During the comprehension part, a clinician will say a sentence with specific emotional intonations and the patient must indicate the correct emotion. These techniques ultimately allow for the diagnosis of dysprosody and the degree of its severity in the patient.

== In the brain ==
Since the discovery of dysprosody, scientists have been attempting to declare a particular area of the brain responsible for prosodic control. It was long believed that the right hemisphere of the brain was responsible for prosodic organization, ultimately leading to a grossly oversimplified hemispheric model. This model argued that the organization of language, centered in the left hemisphere, parallels the organization of prosody in the right hemisphere. Since its release, however, very few studies have given the model any substantial support.

Scientists have attributed major control of the temporal aspects of prosody, including rhythm and timing, to the left hemisphere of the brain. On the other hand, pitch perception, such as singing and linguistics related to emotion, are believed to be organized in the right hemisphere. This belief led to the development of the "Functional Lateralization" hypothesis, stating that dysprosody can be caused by lesions in either the right or left hemispheres. It further states that the left is responsible for acoustic and temporal aspects of prosody, while the right is responsible for pitch and emotion. This hypothesis, however, has also been a cause for concern as studies have shown that people with left hemispheric damage exhibit prosodic deficiencies associated with the right hemisphere as defined by the functional lateralization hypothesis and vice versa. It has also been found that damage to the medulla, cerebellum, and basal ganglia may cause dysprosody. These conclusions have led scientists to believe that prosodic organization in the brain is extremely complex and cannot be attributed to hemispheric divisions alone. Although not well understood yet, studies to identify prosodic organization in the brain continue, primarily through the examination of damaged brain areas in patients with dysprosody and their resulting vocal deficiencies. In addition, dysprosody has been associated with several other conditions, including Parkinson's condition, Huntington's condition, gelastic epilepsy (gelastic seizure), and behavioral disorders such as apathy, akinesia and aboulia. Understanding these disorders and the areas of the brain affected in each case is key in conducting further studies of dysprosody. Scientists are continuing to study these patients in the hope of creating more concrete connections between areas of brain damage and prosodic abnormalities, which will hopefully someday lead to a full understanding of prosodic organization in the brain.

Parkinson's disease is a chronic neurodegenerative disorder that involves the loss of dopaminergic neurons in the brain. While common symptoms of Parkinson's disease are tremors, rigidity, bradykinesia, and postural instability, dysprosody is also a common problem. A common characteristic feature of dysprosody in Parkinson's is monopitch, or an inability to vary pitch when speaking.

Several studies have been performed investigating the link between Parkinson's and dysprosody. They have concluded that patients with Parkinson's disease tend to struggle with specific areas of prosody; they are less able to produce the loudness, pitch, and rhythm patterns required for expressing certain emotions, such as anger. In general, the voice modulations needed to express strong emotions are particularly difficult for patients with Parkinson's disease. Abnormal pauses in speech are also a characteristic of Parkinsonian dysprosody, including both pauses in general speech and intra-word pauses. A decrease in speech rate can also be observed in Parkinson's patients. The demonstration of deficits in producing and understanding emotional information in modalities other than speech prosody (e.g. facial and gestural) in individuals with Parkinson's disease, as well as in individuals with other disorders affecting basal ganglia circuitry, are providing increasing evidence for an additional non-motorically based dimension underlying prosodic deficits and a meta-analysis examining almost 1300 individuals with Parkinson's disease reported a "robust link" between Parkinson's disease and deficits in recognizing emotion from voice and facial expression.

Studies have also shown a progression of dysprosody over time in patients with Parkinson's disease. Abnormalities in speech rate, pauses, and variation range in speech become worse as the condition progresses. The degradation of prosody in Parkinson's disease over time is independent of motor control issues, and is thus separate from those aspects of the condition. Studies have shown that treatment for Parkinson's disease can help with the dysprosody symptoms, however there is usually an improvement in pitch control only and not in the volume and emotional aspects of the condition. These treatments include medications such as L-DOPA as well as electrophysiological treatments.

== Psychiatric conditions ==
Neurological conditions, such as autism spectrum disorder, and several psychiatric conditions, such as clinical depression and schizophrenia, are characterized by distinctive prosodic patterns. Several studies found an atypical neural processing of expressive dysprosody in individuals diagnosed with autism spectrum disorder.

== Treatment ==
The most effective course of treatment for dysprosody has been speech therapy. The first step in therapy is practice drills which consist of repeating phrases using different prosodic contours, such as pitch, timing, and intonation. Typically a clinician will say either syllables, words, phrases, or nonsensical sentences with certain prosodic contours, and the patient repeats them with the same prosodic contours. Treatment following the lines of the principles of motor learning (PML) was found to improve the production of lexical stress contrasts. Once a patient is able to effectively complete this drill, they can start with more advanced forms of speech therapy. Upon completion of therapy, most people can identify prosodic cues in natural situations, such as normal conversation. Speech therapy has proven most effective for linguistic dysprosody because therapy for emotional dysprosody requires much more effort and is not always successful. One way that people learn to cope with emotional dysprosody is to explicitly state their emotions, rather than relying on prosodic cues.

Over time, there have also been cases of people with dysprosody gaining their native accent back with no course of treatment. Since the part of the brain responsible for dysprosody has not definitely been discovered, nor has the mechanism for the brain processes which cause dysprosody been found, there has not been much treatment for the condition by means of medication.

== Future research ==
In the past decade research on dysprosody has begun to focus on its relationship to other, more common conditions such as Parkinson's condition. Scientists believe that studying the connections between dysprosody and these better understood conditions may help them pinpoint specific areas of the brain responsible for prosody. Recent research has looked into the development of Dysprosody in connection with Parkinson's condition, not only looking at voice and speech issues, but also the effects on cognitive-linguistic and prosody perception and production.

== History ==
The first documented occurrence of dysprosody was described by Pierre Marie, a French neurologist, in 1907. Marie described the case of a Frenchman who started speaking in an Alsatian accent after a cerebrovascular accident caused right hemiplegia.

The next documented report of dysprosody occurred in 1919 by Arnold Pick, a German neurologist. He noticed a 29-year-old Czechoslovak had started speaking in a Polish accent following a stroke. Pick's patient also had right hemiparesis, a lesser version of hemiplegia, and aphasia after the stroke. Pick noticed that not only was the accent altered, but the timing of the speech was slower, and the patient spoke with uncharacteristic grammatical mistakes. Pick later wanted to follow up on his research but was not able to, since the patient had died with no autopsy performed.

The most well documented account of dysprosody was in 1943 by G. H. Monrad-Krohn. A woman, Astrid L., in Norway was hit with a shell fragment during an air raid in 1941 through her left frontal bone, leaving her brain exposed. She was unconscious for four days and when she regained consciousness at the hospital, she was hemiplegic on her right side, was having seizures, and was aphasic. Initially she could only speak in monosyllables, yes and no, but then started to form sentences. When first starting to speak again, she also spoke with uncharacteristic grammatical errors, but over time they became much less pronounced and eventually she gained back full fluency of speech. However, she sounded as though she was speaking her native Norwegian with a German accent. It was two years later that she was admitted to the Neurological University Clinic in Oslo, Norway and seen by Dr. Monrad-Krohn. Krohn examined the patient and noted that there was no noticeable difference in her fluency, motor functions, sensory functions, or coordination. Upon examination of her skull, he found a large scar on the left fronto-temporo-parietal region. This was not as helpful as Krohn would have liked. Since the scar was so extensive, it was impossible for Krohn to pinpoint the exact region of the brain which was causing this altered speech. Krohn then ran tests on Astrid to assess her language comprehension. He found that in addition to her altered speech patterns, she had trouble finding the Norwegian words for trivial objects, such as light switch and match box. She also had to repeat the examiner's questions aloud before answering, had to say words out loud to herself before writing them down, and had difficulty comprehending written instructions. Krohn could not understand how she had acquired a foreign accent; it could not be attributed to any known disorder or condition. For those with this type of dysprosody, sometimes the accents they speak are from countries to which the person has never been. This is very puzzling for neuroscientists, since dialects and accents are considered to be an acquired behavior of learning pitches, intonations and stress patterns.

There have been another 21 cases documented up until 1978. Thirteen of those cases were documented at the Mayo Clinic, while the others were documented at clinics and hospitals elsewhere.

There have been more recent occurrences of people who have developed accents after brain injuries, specifically strokes. In 1999, Judi Roberts had a stroke which paralyzed the right side of her body, leaving her unable to speak. Over time, her speech began to improve, eventually recovering full fluency, but she developed a British accent despite having lived in the US for her whole life. In 2006, another report was documented of Linda Walker, a native of England, who developed a foreign accent after having a stroke.

== See also ==
- Lists of language disorders
