= Telegraphic speech =

Language development stage

Telegraphic speech, according to linguistics and psychology, is speech during the two-word stage of language acquisition in children, which is laconic and efficient. It follows the Holophrastic speech stage of language acquisition in children.

== Background ==
The name derives from the fact that someone sending a telegram was generally charged by the word. To save money, people typically wrote their telegrams in a very compressed style, without conjunctions or articles.

== Term in anthropology and developmental psychology ==
As children develop language, they speak similarly: when a child says "cat here", it is understood that the child means "cat is here", omitting the copula. The words dropped in this style of speech are closed class or function words.

In the field of psychology, telegraphic speech is defined as a form of communication consisting of simple two-word long sentences often composed of a noun and a verb that adhere to the grammatical standards of the culture's language, with the ordering dependent on the language's conventions on word order (i.e. subject-verb-object for English). For example, an English-speaking child would say "Give cupcake" to express that they would like a cupcake rather than "Cupcake give", as a Turkish- or Japanese-speaking child would.

Researchers have noted that this period of language acquisition occurs some time between the ages of 18 and 36 months and is present not just in English-speaking cultures, but can be found worldwide.

== Clinical term ==
In adults, regression to telegraphic speech may indicate a neurological problem such as multiple sclerosis. Telegraphic speech is also common in non-fluent aphasia (Broca's aphasia), which is caused by a stroke damaging the posterior-inferior frontal lobe.

It is also a potential symptom of schizophrenia, as a manifestation of manneristic speech.

== See also ==
- Critical period (linguistics)
