= Redundancy (linguistics) =

Information that is expressed more than once

In linguistics, a redundancy is information that is expressed more than once. Examples of redundancies include multiple agreement features in morphology, multiple features distinguishing phonemes in phonology, or the use of multiple words to express a single idea in rhetoric.

== Grammar ==
Redundancy may occur at any level of grammar. Because of agreement – a requirement in many languages that the form of different words in a phrase or clause correspond with one another – the same semantic information may be expressed several times. In the Spanish phrase los árboles verdes ("the green trees"), for example, the article los, the noun árboles, and the adjective verdes are all inflected to show that the phrase is plural. An English example would be: that man is a soldier versus those men are soldiers.

In phonology, a minimal pair is a pair of words or phrases that differs by only one phoneme, the smallest distinctive unit of the sound system. Even so, phonemes may differ on several phonetic features. For example, the English phonemes /p/ and /b/ in the words pin and bin feature different voicing, aspiration, and muscular tension. Any one of these features is sufficient to differentiate /p/ from /b/ in English.

Generative grammar uses such redundancy to simplify the form of grammatical description. Any feature that can be predicted on the basis of other features (such as aspiration on the basis of voicing) need not be indicated in the grammatical rule. Features that are not redundant and therefore must be indicated by rule are called distinctive features.

As with agreement in morphology, phonologically conditioned alternation, such as coarticulation and assimilation, add redundancy on the phonological level. The redundancy of phonological rules may clarify some vagueness in spoken communication. According to psychologist Steven Pinker, "In the comprehension of speech, the redundancy conferred by phonological rules can compensate for some of the ambiguity of the sound wave. For example, a speaker may know that thisrip must be this rip and not the srip because in English the initial consonant cluster sr is illegal."

== Redundancy versus repetition ==
Writing guides, especially for technical writing, usually advise avoiding redundancy, "especially the use of two expressions that mean the same thing. Such repetition works against readability and conciseness." Others make a distinction between redundancy and repetition:

Repetition, if used well, can be a good tool to use in your writing. It can add emphasis to what you are trying to say and strengthen a point. There are many types of useful repetition. Redundancy, on the other hand, cannot be a good thing. Redundancy happens when the repetition of a word or idea does not add anything to the previous usage; it just restates what has already been said, takes up space, and gets in the way without adding meaning.

Computer scientist Donald E. Knuth, author of highly acclaimed textbooks, recommends "to state things twice, in complementary ways, especially when giving a definition. This reinforces the reader's understanding."

== See also ==
- Bilingual tautological expressions
- Concision – Writing principle of using few words
- Markedness – State of standing out as unusual
- Oxymoron – Figure of speech
- Pleonasm – Redundancy in linguistic expression
- Purple prose – Overly ornate and distracting prose
- RAS syndrome – Redundant use of acronyms
- Redundancy – information that is expressed more than once
- Redundancy check – Reliable digital data delivery methods on unreliable channels
- Stilted speech – Unusually formal speech
- Tautology (language) – In literary criticism, repeating an idea
