= Dysorthography =

- Specialty: Neurology, pediatrics

Dysorthography is a disorder of spelling which accompanies dyslexia by a direct consequence of the phonological disorder. In the American classification from the American Psychiatric Association (APA) and the classification from the World Health Organization (WHO), it is a subtype of specific learning disorder with impairment in written expression.

== Signs and symptoms ==
Dysorthography impacts some individuals more than others, but the most typical symptoms are usually difficulty spelling and spelling mistakes, mistaking spoken and written words, writing words together, or confusing letters, using apostrophes improperly or not at all, and article misuse or confusion.

== Treatment ==
The cause of this disorder needs to be identified in order to be treated. Pronunciation problems, visual or auditory impairments, or even an unfavorable study environment are frequently the causes. The speech therapist or child psychologist may recommend a course of treatment that focuses on learning and applying proper spelling, as well as resolving related issues, based on the cause and degree of impairment.

== See also ==
- Orthography
- Dyslexia
