= Asemia =

Inability to understand or express any signs or symbols

Asemia is the term for the medical condition of being unable to understand or express any signs or symbols. It is a more severe condition than aphasia, which is the inability to understand linguistic signs. Asemia is caused by damage to the areas of the brain that process communication – more specifically, when there is damage to the left side of the brain in the areas that process communication such as Broca's and Wernicke's areas. Damage can be inflicted by physical trauma to the brain, but is more commonly caused by stroke and sometimes tumors. The onset of this condition is usually quick but not permanent. Treatment of this condition is traditional speech therapy in which the individual must relearn how to read, write, and talk. Depending on the severity of the injury, recovery can take days to years. Considerable recovery is common, but often not to the full extent of baseline ability.

== Symptoms and signs ==
Asemia is a more severe condition than aphasia, so it does have some similarities with the disease. People who have asemia have the inability to comprehend signs, symbols, and even language. They also have the inability to use signs, symbols, and language. People with asemia sometimes may take up asemic writing, which is "wordless" writing. What wordless writing could mean is that the writing looks like regular or traditional writing, but there is no content that makes sense. The concept of syntax, semantics, or even communication does not exist in asemic writing.

== Causes ==
The most common cause of asemia is brain damage, such as a stroke or a brain tumor. Other possible causes include Alzheimer's disease and infection. Roger Wolcott Sperry, through his research of split-brain patients, had found out that the human brain lateralizes functions, meaning that the two hemispheres of the brain have different functions. Brain damage, specifically to the left hemisphere, can impair our ability to speak or understand language. This led Sperry to conclude that due to the lateralization of brain function, language is based in the left hemisphere. Therefore, any kind of brain damage to the left hemisphere will greatly impact language, whether it is expressive or receptive.

== Treatment ==
Speech therapy is usually the most common treatment for asemia. Speech therapy allows the patient to be able to improve their speaking, comprehension, and writing skills. These patients have to learn all of these skills again since they are unable to understand or express anything. It usually depends on how long it takes for the speech therapy to work. If the condition is less severe, it will take less time, such as perhaps a couple of months to years. If the condition is more severe, it may take many years. The way speech therapy works is through speech practice as well as using special computer programs which let the patient practice their communication skills. By using simple and short sentences or writing down these phrases can aid the patients while going through therapy. Giving them enough time to communicate with their friends, family, or therapist will help them increase their skills and be able to manage them.

Complete success is usually achieved with treatment. However, sometimes only partial success is achieved and the patient cannot fully comprehend everything. With the partial restoration of some skills, the speech therapist may only focus on the skills which can be restored. In other cases, the therapist may work on the skills which may not retrieved and teach the patient how to handle those.

== See also ==
- Lists of language disorders
