= Flaccid dysarthria =

- Specialty: Neurology

Flaccid dysarthria is a motor speech disorder resulting from damage to peripheral nervous system (cranial or spinal nerves) or lower motor neuron system. Depending on which nerves are damaged, flaccid dysarthria affects respiration, phonation, resonance, and articulation. It also causes weakness, hypotonia (low-muscle tone), and diminished reflexes. Perceptual effects of flaccid dysarthria can include hypernasality, imprecise consonant productions, breathiness of voice, and affected nasal emission.

== Causes ==
Flaccid dysarthria is caused when damage occurs to the motor unit (one or more cranial or spinal nerves). Processes that can cause this include:

- Congenital disorders
- Demyelinating disorders
- Infectious/Inflammatory
- Degenerative disorders
- Metabolic
- Neoplastic
- Traumatic
- Vascular Diseases
- Flaccid Paralysis

== Diagnosis ==
The hallmark of flaccid dysarthria is weakness, affecting different muscles, depending on where the damage has occurred. Some common signs include the following

Phonation and prosody:

Damage to cranial nerve X can present as changes in voice quality. One or both vocal folds may be effectively paralyzed, or have diminished function. If a vocal fold is stuck in an adducted or closed position, the voice will be harsh and low in volume. A vocal fold stuck in an abducted or open position may cause breathiness and low volume. Listen for vocal flutter and diplophonia. Having both vocal folds stuck in an abducted position creates a breathy voice, with potential inspiratory stridor. Having both vocal folds stuck in an adducted or closed position compromises the airway significantly. In addition to these changes in phonation, someone may have issues changing their pitch or loudness. Or, they may speak in short phrases, as they release more air than normal through their larynx while speaking.

Resonance:

Damage to the cranial nerves innervating muscles that control the velum may result in hypernasal speech. This can sound like someone is saying things through their nose, making oral sounds like "b" or "d" sound more like "m" or "n", respectively. Or, there may be air release through the nose that is audible, as in an attempt to say "s".

Articulation:

Damage to the cranial nerves innervating the lips, tongue and other key muscles for making speech sounds may result in inaccurate or imprecise articulation. This may improve with rest.

Other:

Flaccid paralysis can cause muscles to atrophy or lose mass over time. Twitches in the affected muscle fibres (fasciculations) may be present. In the tongue, this resembles worms moving in the tissue. If the muscles of the face are affected (i.e. if there is damage to cranial nerve VII; V for the jaw in mastication), there may be drooping, sagging or drooling. When the tongue moves forward (as in a protrusion exercise), it will move to the stronger side. If the person is asked to move their jaw, it will be opposite (toward the weaker side). Other visible signs that accompany flaccid dysarthria include facial or soft palate droop, or nasal regurgitation with eating (again, if the velum is an affected area). Issues with eating are common, given the shared nature of the muscles for talking and those for chewing and swallowing. These require evaluation alongside any speech difficulties, and if present, may be medically serious (i.e. if material enters the lungs, or if not enough food is able to be eaten).

== Treatment ==
Treatment may be carried out by a range of professionals (i.e. speech-language pathologists/therapists, rehabilitation specialists, or others with training in this area). Treatments may include direct work on the nerves and muscles involved (see below, organised by affected component of speech); counselling; partner training (i.e. to improve their ability to understand the affected person, or implement exercises); or, training aimed at helping the person themselves compensate for their condition (i.e. using gestures to supplement a message; using a device to talk; advocating for others to wait while they get their message across). Note that treatment should be planned and supervised by a trained professional, and tailored to the individual's specific profile.

Phonation and prosody: Behavioural treatments may include turning one's head to the affected side during speech or lateralizing the thyroid cartilage; making an effortful closure of the vocal folds or an abrupt glottal attack; or, producing intense high-level phonation. Medical treatments may include surgery such as medialization laryngoplasty; arytenoid adduction; or, fat/collagen injections. Prosthetic approaches may include artificial larynges; or abdominal binders/corsets (to provide best posture for speech, and support stronger exhalation, if affected muscles include those controlling breathing).

Resonance: Behavioural treatments may include use of CPAP machines, supine positioning (lying down, to help train velum closure), or reducing pressure during held consonants (i.e. 's' or 'z' sounds). Again, some medical or prosthetic approaches may be utilised, including palatal lifts, or pharyngeal flap procedures.

Articulation: Behavioural treatments may include various speech sound strengthening or accuracy re-training exercises.
