= Language delay =

Language disorder marked by delayed language development

A language delay is a language disorder in which a child fails to develop language abilities at the usual age-appropriate period in their developmental timetable. It is most commonly seen in children ages two to seven years-old and can continue into adulthood. The reported prevalence of language delay ranges from 2.3 to 19 percent.

Language delays are distinct from speech delays, in which the development of the mechanical and motor aspects of speech production are delayed. Many tend to confuse language delay with speech delay or even just late talker. All of these have different telltale signs and determining factors. Speech delay seems to be more similar to late talker compared to language delay. Speech is the verbal motor production of language, while language is a means of communication. Because language and speech are independent, they may be individually delayed. For example, a child may be delayed in speech (i.e., unable to produce intelligible speech sounds), but not delayed in language because they use a Sign Language. Additionally, language delay encompasses the entirety of language developmental progress being slowed and not just the speech aspects.

Language delays are recognized by comparing language development of children to recognized developmental milestones. They are presented in a variety of ways, as every individual child has a unique set of language skills and deficiencies that are identifiable through many different screenings and tools. There are different causes leading to language delay; it is often a result of another developmental disorder and treatment requires analysis of the unique individual causes. The condition is frequently observed early on, among two- and three-year-olds. Early language delays are only considered risk-factors in leading to more severe language disorders.

== Language development ==
The anatomical language centers of the brain are the Broca's and Wernicke's area. These two areas include all aspects of the development of language. The Broca's area is the motor portion of language at the left posterior inferior frontal gyrus and involves speech production. The Wernicke's area is the sensory portion of language at the posterior part of the left superior temporal gyrus and involves verbal comprehension.

There are recognizable speech and language developmental milestones in children. For children with language delays, milestones in their language development may be different or slowed. Recent studies have shown the different milestones for children with language delay compared to children with normal language development. Language delays are often identified when a child strays from the expected developments in the timeline of typical speech and language developmental milestones that researchers agree on. Children can stray slightly from the confines of the expected timeline; however, if a child is observed to be largely straying from the expected timeline, the child's caretaker should consult with a medical specialist.

=== Timeline of typical speech and language developmental milestones ===
This timeline only provides a very general and brief outline of expected developments from birth to age five, individual children can still exhibit varying development patterns as this timeline only serves as a general guideline. This timeline is only one model, other models regarding language development exist. The development of language remains a theoretical mystery.

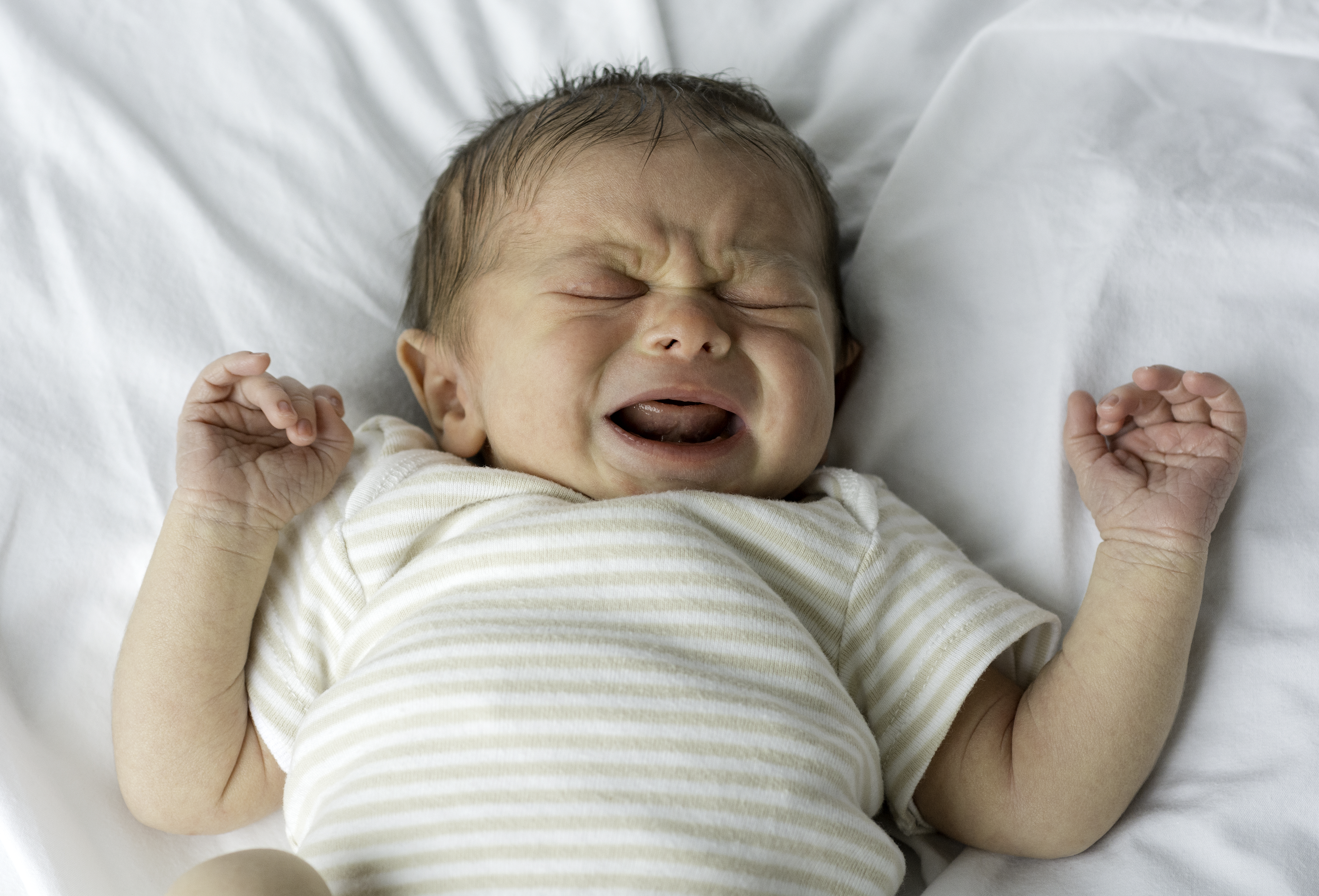
Newborn baby: No language skills developed yet, but is communicating through actions and sounds such as crying.

Around 2 months, babies can make "cooing" sounds.

Around 4 months, babies can respond to voices.

Around 6 months, babies begin to babble and respond to names.

Around 9 months, babies begin to produce mama/dada - appropriate terms and are able to imitate one word at a time.

Around 12 months, toddlers can typically speak one or more words. They can produce two words with meaning.

Around 15 months, toddlers begin to produce jargon, which is defined as "pre-linguistic vocalizations in which infants use adult-like stress and intonation".

Around 18 months, toddlers can produce 10 words and follow simple commands.

Around 24 months, toddlers begin to produce 2-3 words and phrases that use "I", "Me", and "you", indicating possession. They are about 25% intelligible.

Around 3 years, toddlers are able to use language in numerical terms.

Based on the milestones set for typical toddlers, if the child tends to have a lot of or very long delays, they may be deemed as having language delay. However, proper testing by a professional like a speech therapist or a doctor's confirmation will be required to determine if a child has language delay. Although these milestones are the typical milestones for a child, they should not be followed strictly as they are mere guidelines.

=== Language development in language delay ===
Early developmental language delay is characterized by slow language development in preschoolers. Language development for children with language delay takes longer than the general timeline provided above. It is not only slower, but also presents itself in different forms. For example, a child with a language delay could have weaker language skills such as the ability to produce phrases at 24 months-old. They may find themselves producing language that is different from language norms in developing children.

== Types ==
A language delay is commonly divided into receptive and expressive categories. Both categories are essential in developing effective communication.

Receptive language refers to the process of understanding language, both verbal (spoken) and nonverbal (written, gestural). This may involve gaining information from sounds and words, visual information from surrounding environment, written information and grammar.

Expressive language refers to the use of sentences (made of words or signs) to communicate messages to others. It enables children to express their needs and wants to the people around them, interact with others and develop their language skills in speech and writing. Some expressive language skills include putting words together into sentences, being able to label objects in an environment and describing events and actions.

=== Receptive language delay ===
Children that are diagnosed with receptive language delay have difficulties understanding language. They may have trouble with receptive language skills such as identifying vocabulary and basic concepts, understanding gestures, following directions and answering questions. The number of language skills that children have difficulties with can differ greatly, with some having trouble with only a single skill and others having trouble with multiple.

=== Expressive language delay ===
A child diagnosed with expressive language delay (ELD) has trouble with language usage in some way. As this diagnosis is very broad, each child diagnosed with ELD can be very different in terms of the language skills they have problems with. Some may have difficulty with using the correct words and vocabulary, some have trouble forming sentences and others are unable to sequence information together coherently. Expressive language symptoms come in many forms and each one is treated with different methods.

== Presentation and diagnosis ==
A language delay is most commonly identified around 18 months of age with an enhanced well-baby visit. It presents itself in many forms and can be comorbid or develop as a result of other developmental delays. Language delays act and develop differently individually. Language delay is different than individual variation in language development, and is defined by children falling behind on the timeline for recognized milestones.

=== Screening ===
Regular appointments with a pediatrician in infancy can help identify signs of language delay. According to the American Academy of Pediatrics (AAP), formal screening for language delay is recommended at three ages: 9, 18, and 24–30 months. Screening is a two-part process: first, a general developmental screening using tools such as the Parents' Evaluation of Developmental Status or Ages and Stages Questionnaire (ASQ-3); and second, specific screening for autism spectrum disorder using tools like the Modified Checklist for Autism in Toddlers. Not all patients with language delay have autism spectrum disorder, so the AAP recommends both screens to assess for delays in developmental milestones.

It is possible to test language at ages 0–36 months, using tools such as The Early Language Milestone. However, the US Preventive Services Task Force (last updated in 2015) has determined that there is insufficient evidence to recommend screening for language delay in children under the age of 5. Other national panels, including the UK National Screening Committee and Canadian Task Force for Preventive Health Care, have also concluded that there is limited evidence on the benefits of screening all infants for language delay.

=== Early signs and symptoms ===
There are several red flags in early infancy and childhood that may indicate a need for evaluation by a pediatrician. For example, language delay can present as a lack of communicative gestures or sounds. Language delay in children is associated with increased difficulty with reading, writing, attention, and/or socialization. In addition, an inability to engage in social exchanges is a sign of language delay at all ages.

Communicative deficits at specific ages and milestones might indicate language delay, including:

- Not smiling at 3 months
- Not turning the head toward sounds at 4 months
- Not laughing or responding to sounds at 6 months
- Not babbling at 9 months
- Not pointing and using gestures at 12 months
- Not producing more than 5 words at 18 months
- Not producing more than 50 words at 24 months
- Losing language and/or social skills after 36 months

Later in life, important signs include:

- A lack of speech
- An inability to comprehend, process, or understand language presented to the child

=== Consequences of language delay ===
Language delay is a risk factor for other types of developmental delay, including social, emotional, and cognitive delay. Language delay can impact behavior, reading and spelling ability, and overall IQ scores. Some children may outgrow deficits in reading and writing while others do not. Other conditions associated with language delay include attention-deficit/hyperactivity disorder, autism spectrum disorder, and social communication disorder.

== Causes ==
Language delays are the most frequent developmental delays, and can occur for many reasons. A delay can be due to being a "late bloomer", "late talker", or a more serious problem. Such delays can occur in conjunction with a lack of mirroring of facial responses, unresponsiveness or unawareness of certain noises, a lack of interest in playing with other children or toys, or no pain response to stimuli.

=== Socio-economic factors ===
Socio-economic status

Children from families of low educational level are more likely to have delays and difficulties in expressive language. While language development is not directly affected by the socioeconomic level of a family, the conditions that are associated with the socioeconomic level affects the process of language development to a certain extent. A child's early vocabulary development can be influenced by socioeconomic status via maternal speech, which varies according to the socioeconomic status of the family. Mothers with higher education levels are more likely to use rich vocabulary and speak in longer utterances when interacting with their children, which helps them develop their productive vocabulary more than children from a lower socioeconomic status.

Poverty is also a high risk factor for language delay as it results in a lack of access to appropriate therapies and services. The likelihood of those requiring early intervention for language delays actually receiving help is extremely low compared to those that don't actually need it.

=== Natural/medical factors ===
Hearing loss

The process of children acquiring language skills involves hearing sounds and words from their caregivers and surroundings. Hearing loss causes that lack of these sound inputs, causing these children to have difficulties learning to use and understand language, which will eventually lead to delayed speech and language skills. For example, they may struggle with putting sentences together, understanding speech from other people or using the correct grammar, which are some language skills that typically developing children possess.

Autism

There is strong evidence that autism is commonly associated with language delay. Children with autism may have difficulties in developing language skills and understanding what is being said to them. They may also have troubles communicating non-verbally by using hand gestures, eye contact and facial expressions. The extent of their language usage is heavily influenced by their intellectual and social developments. The range of their skills can be very different and on opposite ends of a spectrum. Many children with autism develop some speech and language skills, but not like typically developing children, and with uneven progress.

Asperger syndrome, which is classified under the broad umbrella term of autism spectrum disorder, however, is not associated with language delay. Children diagnosed with Asperger syndrome have decent language skills but use language in different ways from others. They may not be able to understand the use of language devices, such as irony and humor, or conversation reciprocity between involved parties.

Heritability

Genes have a very big influence in the presence of language impairments. Neurobiological and genetic mechanisms have a strong influence on late language emergence. A child with a family history of language impairments is more likely to have delayed language emergence and persistent language impairments. They are also 2 times more likely to be late talkers as compared to those with no such family history.

Genetic abnormalities may also be a cause of language delays. In 2005, researchers found a connection between expressive language delay and a genetic abnormality: a duplicate set of the same genes that are missing in individuals with Williams-Beuren syndrome. Also so called XYY syndrome can often cause speech delay.

Twins

Being a twin increases the chance of speech and language delays. Reasons for this are thought to include less one-on-one time with parents, the premature birth of twins, and the companionship of their twin sibling reducing their motivation to talk to others.

A twin study has also shown that genetic factors have an important role in language delay. Monozygotic twin pairs (identical twins) recorded a higher consistency than dizygotic twin (fraternal twins) pairs, revealing monozygotic twins experiencing early vocabulary delay is attributed to genetic etiology. The environmental factors that influences both twins also play a big role in causing early language delay, but only when it is transient.

Gender

Research has shown that boys are at greater risk for delayed language development than girls. Almost all developmental disorders that affect communication, speech and language skills are more common in males than in females. British scientists have found that the male sex hormone (testosterone) levels were related to the development of both autism and language disorders, which explains why boys are at a greater risk of developmental disorders biologically.

Perinatal conditions

There is a high prevalence of early language delay among toddlers with neonatal brachial plexus palsy. Hand usage and gestures are part of the motor system and have been proven correlate to comprehension and production aspects in language development. An interruption in the hand/arm usage caused by this condition during stages of language development could possibly cause these children to experience language delays.

Stress during pregnancy is associated with language delay. High levels of prenatal stress can result in poorer general intellectual and language outcomes. Chemical exposure during pregnancy may also be a factor that causes language delays.

=== Environmental factors ===
Interactive communication and parental inputs

Psychosocial deprivation can cause language delays in children. An example of this is when a child does not spend enough time communicating with adults through ways such as babbling and joint attention. Research on early brain development shows that babies and toddlers have a critical need for direct interactions with parents and other significant care givers for healthy brain growth and the development of appropriate social, emotional, and cognitive skills.

A study examining the role of interactive communication between parents and children has shown that parents' language towards toddlers with language delay differ from parents' language towards typically developing toddlers in terms of the quality of interaction. While late talkers and children with typical language development both receive similar quantitative parental input in terms of the number of utterances and words, parents of late talkers are found to respond less often to their children than parents of children with typical language development. Parents of late talkers tend to change or introduce topics more often than other parents in order to engage their children in more talk rather than responding to their child's speech. They also seem to not provide an environment that is suitable for child engagement, nor do they establish routines that serve as a platform for communicative acts with their children. This, together with the fact that they respond less often to their children, shows that parents of late talkers do not follow their child's lead. Instead, these parents are more likely to adapt to the child's communication, which results in an "idiosyncratic feedback cycle" that worsens the child's language difficulties rather than help with their language acquisition.

Birth order

First-born children grow up in an environment that provides more possibilities of communicative interaction with adults, which differs from what is experienced by their younger siblings. Younger siblings are likely to have less one-on-one time with their parents or guardians. Older siblings also tend to talk for their younger siblings, giving them less opportunities to grow their language skills.

Television viewing

Excessive television viewing is associated with delayed language development. Children who watched television alone were 8.47 times more likely to have language delay when compared to children who interacted with their caregivers during television viewing. Some educational television shows, such as Blue's Clues, have been found to enhance a child's language development. But, as recommended by the American Academy of Pediatrics, children under the age of 2 should watch no television at all, and after age 2 watch no more than one to two hours of quality programming a day. Therefore, exposing such young children to television programs should be discouraged, especially television shows with no educational value. Parents should engage children in more conversational activities to avoid television-related delays to their children language development, which could impair their intellectual performance. However, in a study conducted by Dr. Birken of the Hospital for Sick Children, it was found that watching television while interacting with a parent of caregiver is actually beneficial for children who are bilingual. The study spanned four years, from 2011 to 2015, and was based on parent report and clinician observation. Over the four years it was found that if a bilingual child had interaction with an adult while watching television they did not experience language delay and it in fact helped them develop English, their second language.

== Treatment ==
Studies have failed to find clear evidence that a language delay can be prevented by training or educating health care professionals in the subject. Overall, some of the reviews show positive results regarding interventions in language delay, but are not curative. To treat an already existing language delay a child would need Speech and Language Therapy to correct any deficits. These therapists can be found in schools, clinics, through home care agencies, and also colleges where Communication Sciences and Disorders are studied. Most young children with language delay recover to a normal range by five years of age.

Aside from these, it is still encouraged for the child's parent to get involved. A few ways that a parent could get involved with helping to improve a child's language and speech skills includes speaking to their child with enthusiasm, engaging in conversations revolving what the child is focusing on, and reading to their child frequently.

Social and play skills appear to be more difficult for children with language delays due to their decreased experience in conversation. Speech pathologists utilize methods such as prompting to improve a child's social skills through play intervention. While recent studies have consistently found play intervention to be helpful, further research is required in order to determine the effectiveness of this form of therapy.

Unfortunately, there is still not a lot of methods and cures that help children with language delay. However, there have been some recent therapy methods that have caused improvement in children with language delay. Certain types of therapy have been seen to show more or better improvement for the children compared to regular speech therapy. One such example is in the form of therapeutic horseback riding. It is also mentioned in a study that animals are a good source of therapy for children with special needs in areas including communication skills.

In regards to demographic factors causing language delay, specifically poverty, system-level changes improve access to treatment and therapy for children with language delay.

=== Intervention ===
The parent and child relationship is bi-directional, which means that parents have an influence over their child's language development, while the child has an influence over the parent's communication styles. Parents have the ability to maintain language delay by offering the child a non-verbal environment or one where their communication may not be challenged. Intervention programs and strategies are found to be beneficial to children with a specific language impairments. Research has found that the management strategies put to use are influenced by the child and the important participation of the parents. Parents are likely to follow the lead of the child's language development.

One approach for intervening is naturalistic intervention. The child is in a natural environment where the communication is more responsive, rather than being more direct.

== See also ==
Syndromes or disorders

- Auditory processing disorder
- Down syndrome
- Developmental verbal dyspraxia
- Nonverbal autism

General topics

- Bilingualism
- Cleft palate
- Late talker
- Psycholinguistics
- Speech therapy
- Utterance
- Speech production (vocalization)
