= Verbosity =

Excessive use of words

Verbosity, or verboseness, is speech or writing that uses more words than necessary. The opposite of verbosity is brevity.

Some teachers, including the author of The Elements of Style, warn against verbosity. Similarly Mark Twain and Ernest Hemingway, among others, famously avoided it.

Synonyms of "verbosity" include wordiness, verbiage, loquacity, garrulousness, logorrhea, prolixity, grandiloquence, expatiation, sesquipedalianism, and overwriting.

== Etymology and synonyms ==
The word verbosity comes from Latin verbosus, "wordy". There are many other English words that also refer to the use of excessive words.

Prolixity comes from Latin prolixus, "extended". Prolixity can also be used to refer to the length of a monologue or speech, especially a formal address such as a lawyer's oral argument.

Grandiloquence is complex speech or writing judged to be pompous or bombastic diction. It is a combination of the Latin words grandis ("great") and loqui ("to speak").

Logorrhea or logorrhoea (from Greek λογόρροια, logorrhoia, "word-flux") is an excessive flow of words. It is often used pejoratively to describe prose that is hard to understand because it is needlessly complicated or uses excessive jargon.

Sesquipedalianism is a linguistic style that involves the use of long words. Roman poet Horace coined the phrase sesquipedalia verba in his Ars Poetica. It is a compound of sesqui, "one and a half", and pes, "foot", a reference to meter (not words a foot long). The earliest recorded usage in English of sesquipedalian is in 1656, and of sesquipedalianism, 1863.

Garrulous comes from Latin garrulus, "talkative", a form of the verb garrīre, "to chatter". The adjective may describe a person who is excessively talkative, especially about trivial matters, or a speech that is excessively wordy or diffuse

The noun expatiation and the verb expatiate come from Latin expatiātus, past participle from spatiārī, "to wander". They refer to enlarging a discourse, text, or description.

Overwriting is a simple compound of the English prefix "over-" ("excessive") and "writing", and as the name suggests, means using extra words that add little value. One rhetoric professor described it as "a wordy writing style characterized by excessive detail, needless repetition, overwrought figures of speech, and/or convoluted sentence structures." Another writer cited "meaningless intensifiers", "adjectival & adverbial verbosity", "long conjunctions and subordinators", and "repetition and needless information" as common traps that the non-native writers of English the author studied fell into.

== Scientific jargon ==
An essay intentionally filled with "logorrhea" that mixed physics concepts with sociological concepts in a nonsensical way was published by physics professor Alan Sokal in a journal (Social Text) as a scholarly publishing sting. The episode became known as the Sokal Affair.

The term is sometimes also applied to unnecessarily wordy speech in general; this is more usually referred to as prolixity. Some people defend the use of additional words as idiomatic, a matter of artistic preference, or helpful in explaining complex ideas or messages.

== Examples ==
Warren G. Harding, the 29th president of the United States, was notably verbose even for his era. A Democratic leader, William Gibbs McAdoo, described Harding's speeches as "an army of pompous phrases moving across the landscape in search of an idea."

The Michigan Law Review published a 229-page parody of postmodern writing titled "Pomobabble: Postmodern Newspeak and Constitutional 'Meaning' for the Uninitiated". The article consists of complicated and context-sensitive self-referencing narratives. The text is peppered with a number of parenthetical citations and asides, which is supposed to mock the cluttered style of postmodern writing.

In The King's English, Fowler gives a passage from The Times as an example of verbosity:

The Emperor received yesterday and to-day General Baron von Beck. ... It may therefore be assumed with some confidence that the terms of a feasible solution are maturing themselves in His Majesty's mind and may form the basis of further negotiations with Hungarian party leaders when the Monarch goes again to Budapest.

Fowler objected to this passage because The Emperor, His Majesty, and the Monarch all refer to the same person: "the effect", he pointed out in Modern English Usage, "is to set readers wondering what the significance of the change is, only to conclude that there is none." Fowler called this tendency "elegant variation" in his later style guides.

== Style advice ==
The ancient Greek philosopher Callimachus is quoted as saying "Big book, big evil" (μέγα βιβλίον μέγα κακόν, mega biblion, mega kakon), rejecting the epic style of poetry in favor of his own.

Many style guides advise against excessive verbosity. While it may be rhetorically useful verbose parts in communications are sometimes referred to as "fluff" or "fuzz". For instance, William Strunk, an American professor of English advised in 1918 to "Use the active voice: Put statements in positive form; Omit needless words."

In A Dictionary of Modern English Usage (1926) Henry Watson Fowler says, "It is the second-rate writers, those intent rather on expressing themselves prettily than on conveying their meaning clearly, & still more those whose notions of style are based on a few misleading rules of thumb, that are chiefly open to the allurements of elegant variation," Fowler's term for the over-use of synonyms. Contrary to Fowler's criticism of several words being used to name the same thing in English prose, in many other languages, including French, it is considered a good writing style.

An inquiry into the 2005 London bombings found that verbosity can be dangerous if used by emergency services. It can lead to delay that could cost lives.

A 2005 study from the psychology department of Princeton University found that using long and obscure words does not make people seem more intelligent. Dr. Daniel M. Oppenheimer did research which showed that students rated short, concise texts as being written by the most intelligent authors. But those who used long words or complex font types were seen as less intelligent.

In contrast to advice against verbosity, some editors and style experts suggest that maxims such as "omit needless words" are unhelpful. It may be unclear which words are unnecessary, or where advice against prolixity may harm writing. In some cases a degree of repetition and redundancy, or use of figurative language and long or complex sentences can have positive effects on style or communicative effect.

In nonfiction writing, experts suggest that both concision and clarity are important: Elements that do not improve communication should be removed without rendering a style that is "too terse" to be clear, as similarly advised by law professor Neil Andrews on the writing and reasoning of legal decisions. In such cases, attention should be paid to a conclusion's underlying argument so that the language used is both simple and precise.

A number of writers advise against excessive verbosity in fiction. For example, Mark Twain (1835–1910) wrote "generally, the fewer the words that fully communicate or evoke the intended ideas and feelings, the more effective the communication." Similarly Ernest Hemingway (1899–1961), the 1954 Nobel laureate for literature, defended his concise style against a charge by William Faulkner, the 1949 laureate, that he "had never been known to use a word that might send the reader to the dictionary." Hemingway responded by saying, "Poor Faulkner. Does he really think big emotions come from big words? He thinks I don't know the ten-dollar words. I know them all right. But there are older and simpler and better words, and those are the ones I use."

George Orwell mocked logorrhea in "Politics and the English Language" (1946) by taking verse (9:11) from the book of Ecclesiastes in the King James Version of the Bible:

I returned and saw under the sun, that the race is not to the swift, nor the battle to the strong, neither yet bread to the wise, nor yet riches to men of understanding, nor yet favour to men of skill; but time and chance happeneth to them all.

and rewriting it as

Objective consideration of contemporary phenomena compels the conclusion that success or failure in competitive activities exhibits no tendency to be commensurate with innate capacity, but that a considerable element of the unpredictable must invariably be taken into account.

In contrast, though, some authors warn against pursuing concise writing for its own sake. Literary critic Sven Birkerts, for instance, notes that authors striving to reduce verbosity might produce prose that is unclear in its message or dry in style. "There's no vivid world where every character speaks in one-line, three-word sentences", he notes. There is a danger that the avoidance of prolixity can produce writing that feels unnatural or sterile.

Physicist Richard Feynman has spoken out against verbosity in scientific writing.

Wordiness is common in informal or playful conversation, lyrics, and comedy. People with Asperger syndrome and autism often present with verbose speech.

== See also ==
- Bloviation – Empty, pompous, political speech
- Bullshit bingo – Bingo-style word game
- Cantinflear – Mexican actor and filmmaker (1911–1993)
- Circumlocution – Ambiguous or roundabout figure of speech
- Circumstantial speech – Seemingly tangential discussion that returns to the point
- Concision – Writing principle of using few words
- Gift of the gab – Limestone block in Blarney Castle
- Glittering generality – Phrase which appeals to positive emotion without supporting reason
- Gobbledygook – Nonsensical speech or writing
- List of Germanic and Latinate equivalents in English
- Logorrhea (psychology) – Communication disorder
- Obfuscation – Purposefully unclear communication
- Pleonasm – Redundancy in linguistic expression
- Purple prose – Overly ornate and distracting prose
- Readability – Level of ease with which a reader can understand written text
- Redundancy (linguistics) – Information that is expressed more than once
- Tachylalia – Extremely rapid speech
- Verbose mode – Output option in some software programs
