= Logorrhea =

Communication disorder

In psychology, logorrhea or logorrhoea (from Ancient Greek λόγος logos 'word' and ῥέω rheo 'to flow') is a communication disorder that causes excessive wordiness and repetitiveness, which can cause incoherency. Logorrhea is sometimes classified as a mental illness, though it is more commonly classified as a symptom of mental illness or brain injury. This ailment is often reported as a symptom of Wernicke's aphasia, where damage to the language processing center of the brain creates difficulty in self-centered speech.

== Characteristics ==
Logorrhea is characterized by "rapid, uncontrollable, and incoherent speech". Occasionally, patients with logorrhea may produce speech with normal prosody at a slightly fast speech rate. Other related symptoms include the use of neologisms (new words without clear derivation, e.g. hipidomateous for hippopotamus), words that bear no apparent meaning, and, in some extreme cases, the creation of new words and morphosyntactic constructions. From the "stream of unchecked nonsense often under pressure and the lack of self-correction" that the patient may exhibit, and their circumlocution (the ability to talk around missing words) we may conclude that they are unaware of the grammatical errors they are making.

=== Examples of logorrhea ===
When a clinician said, "Tell me what you do with a comb", to a patient with mild Wernicke's aphasia, which produces the symptom of logorrhea, the patient responded:

What do I do with a comb ... what I do with a comb. Well a comb is a utensil or some such thing that can be used for arranging and rearranging the hair on the head both by men and by women. One could also make music with it by putting a piece of paper behind and blowing through it. Sometimes it could be used in art — in sculpture, for example, to make a series of lines in soft clay. It's usually made of plastic and usually black, although it comes in other colors. It is carried in the pocket or until it's needed, when it is taken out and used, then put back in the pocket. Is that what you had in mind?

In this case, the patient maintained proper grammar and did not exhibit any signs of neologisms. However, the patient did use an overabundance of speech in responding to the clinician, as most people would simply respond, "I use a comb to comb my hair."

In a more extreme version of logorrhea aphasia, a clinician asked a male patient, also with Wernicke's aphasia, what brought him to the hospital. The patient responded:

Is this some of the work that we work as we did before? ... All right ... From when wine [why] I'm here. What's wrong with me because I ... was myself until the taenz took something about the time between me and my regular time in that time and they took the time in that time here and that's when the time took around here and saw me around in it's started with me no time and I bekan [began] work of nothing else that's the way the doctor find me that way ...

In this example, the patient's aphasia was much more severe. Not only was this a case of logorrhea, but this included neologisms (such as "taenz" for "stroke" and "regular time" for "regular bath") and a loss of proper sentence structure.

== Causes ==
Logorrhea has been shown to be associated with traumatic brain injuries in the frontal lobe as well as with lesions in the thalamus and the ascending reticular inhibitory system and has been associated with aphasia. Logorrhea can also result from a variety of psychiatric and neurological disorders including tachypsychia, mania, hyperactivity, catatonia, ADHD and schizophrenia.

=== Aphasias ===
Logorrhea is often associated with Wernicke's and other aphasias. Aphasia refers to the neurological disruption of language that occurs as a consequence of brain dysfunction. A patient who truly has an aphasia cannot have been diagnosed with any other medical condition that may affect cognition. Logorrhea is a common symptom of Wernicke's aphasia, along with circumlocution, paraphasias, and neologisms. A patient with aphasia may present all of these symptoms at one time.

== Treatment ==
Excessive talking may be a symptom of an underlying illness and should be addressed by a medical provider if combined with hyperactivity or symptoms of mental illness, such as hallucinations. Treatment of logorrhea depends on its underlying disorder, if any. Antipsychotics are often used, and lithium is a common supplement given to manic patients. For patients with lesions of the brain, attempting to correct their errors may upset and anger the patients, since the language center of their brain may not be able to process that what they are saying is incorrect and wordy.

== See also ==
- Cluttering – Speech and communication disorder
- Compulsive talking – Personality trait
- Gibberish – Nonsensical speech or writing
- Glossolalia – Phenomenon in which people speak words apparently in languages unknown to them
- Graphorrhea – Disorder of incoherent written rambling
- List of language disorders
- Schizoaffective disorder – Mental disorder
- Schizophrenia – Mental disorder with psychotic symptoms
- Word salad, also known as Schizophasia – Confused unintelligible jumble of words and phrases
