= Circumlocution =

Ambiguous or roundabout figure of speech

Circumlocution (also called circumduction, circumvolution, periphrasis, kenning, or ambage) is the use of an unnecessarily large number of words to express an idea. It is sometimes necessary in communication (for example, to work around lexical gaps that might otherwise lead to untranslatability), but it can also be undesirable (when an uncommon or easily misunderstood figure of speech is used). It can also come in the form of roundabout speech wherein many words are used to describe something that already has a common and concise term (for example, saying "a tool used for cutting things such as paper and hair" instead of "scissors"). Most dictionaries use circumlocution to define words. Circumlocution is often used by people with aphasia and people learning a new language, where simple terms can be paraphrased to aid learning or communication (for example, paraphrasing the word "grandfather" as "the father of one's father"). Among other usages, circumlocution can be used to construct euphemisms, innuendos, and equivocations.

== Language acquisition ==
Circumlocution is often used by beginner and intermediate second language speakers to convey the meaning of a word they don't know in their target language. Relative clauses are often used for circumlocution in English. For example,

[Firefighters] are the people whom you call when your house is on fire. A [spider] is an arachnid that catches insects in its web.

Synonyms and simile are two other common circumlocution strategies. A pomegranate could be described using these techniques as follows:

It's a kind of fruit; it's red, and it has lots and lots of little seeds in it.

== Euphemisms ==
Euphemistic language often uses circumlocution to avoid saying words that are taboo or considered offensive. For example, "Holy mother of Jesus!" is a circumlocution of "Mary!", but "heck", while still euphemistic, is not a circumlocution of "hell".

Euphemistic circumlocution is also used to avoid saying "unlucky words"—words which are taboo for reasons connected with superstition: for example, calling the devil "Old Nick", (Note: "Speak of the devil, and he will appear" is the proverb.) calling Macbeth "the Scottish Play" or saying "baker's dozen" instead of thirteen.

== Innuendo ==
Innuendo refers to something suggested but not explicitly stated.

== Equivocation ==
Equivocation is the use of ambiguous language to avoid telling the truth or forming commitments.

== See also ==
- Analytic language
- Auxiliary verb
- Compound (linguistics)
- Inflection
- Periphrasis
- Sesquipedalianism
- Taboo (game)
- Verbosity
