= Speech delay =

Language development delay, usually observed in children

Speech delay, also known as alalia, refers to a delay in the development or use of the mechanisms that produce speech. Speech – as distinct from language – is the actual process of making sounds, using such organs and structures as the lungs, vocal cords, mouth, tongue, teeth, etc. Language delay refers to a delay in the development or use of the knowledge of language.

Because language and speech are two independent stages, they may be individually delayed. For example, a child may be delayed in speech (i.e., unable to produce intelligible speech sounds), but not delayed in language. In this case, the child would be attempting to produce an age appropriate amount of language, but that language would be difficult or impossible to understand. Conversely, since a child with a language delay typically has not yet had the opportunity to produce speech sounds, they are likely to have a delay in speech as well.

== Signs and symptoms ==
The warning signs of early speech delay are categorized into age-related milestones, beginning at the age of 12 months and continuing through early adolescence.

At the age of 12 months, there is cause for concern if the child is not able to do the following:

- Using gestures such as waving good-bye and pointing at objects
- Practicing the use of several different consonant sounds
- Vocalizing or communicating needs

Between the ages of 15 and 18 months children are at a higher risk for speech delay if they are displaying the following:

- Not saying "momma" and "dada"
- Not reciprocating when told "no", "hello", and "bye"
- Does not have a one to three word vocabulary at 12 months and up to 15 words by 18 months
- Is unable to identify body parts
- Displaying difficulties imitating sounds and actions
- Shows preference to gestures over verbalization

Additional signs of speech delay after the age of 2 years and up to the age of 4 include the following:

- Inability to spontaneously produce words and phrases
- Inability to follow simple directions and commands
- Cannot make two word connections
- Lacks consonant sounds at the beginning or end of words
- Is difficult to understand by close family members
- Is not able to display the tasks of common household objects
- Is unable to form simple 2 to 3 word sentences

== Effects ==
Studies show that children diagnosed with speech delay are more likely to present with behavioral and social emotional problems both in childhood and as adults. Decreased receptive language, reading, and learning skills are common side effects for children that have a speech delay and do not receive adequate intervention. Similar studies suggest that children with speech delays are more likely to have a difficult time communicating and bonding with peers, which could have negative effects on their psychosocial health later in life.

== Causes ==
At times, speech delay and impairment is caused by a physical disruption in the mouth such as a deformed frenulum, lips, or palate. If the motion or ability to form words and appropriate sounds is disrupted, the child may be slow to pick up words and lack the ability to shape their mouth and tongue in the formation of words.

Other more serious concerns are those that can be caused by oral-motor issues. Oral-motor dysfunction refers to a lack or delay in the area of the brain that speech is formed and created and communicated to the mouth and tongue. While speech may be the only concern, this disorder can be highlighted with feeding issues as well.

Children that are having speech delay disorders could have the following characteristics (Shriberg 1982):

- Speech mechanism in which speech is associated with hearing, motor speech and craniofacial malfunction
- Cognitive-linguistic aspects in which the impairment is associated with the child's intellectual, receptive, expressive and linguistic ability.
- Psychosocial issues in which the impairment is associated with caregiver, school environment, and the child's self behaviors such as aggression and maturity

The many other causes of speech delay include bilingual children with phonological disorders, autism spectrum conditions, childhood apraxia, auditory processing disorder, prematurity, cognitive impairment and hearing loss. Some posit that excess screen time may negatively impact speech development. Broomfield and Dodd's (2004a) found out after survey that 6.4% of children who are perfectly normal showed speech difficulty while they lacked these disorders will often show early signs and are at times identified as "at risk" when the speech delay is diagnosed. However, a study done in Saudi Arabia showed no relationship between smart device use and speech delay, although 64.8% of the parents believed that the smart devices are a "problem". A review study from Indonesia points out the existence of contradicting results on that issue.

In the case of speech delay in a child with autism, there may not be a physiological cause such as an oral-motor issue or hearing loss. The child may prefer to communicate using non-spoken language or use a nonverbal communication method. Studies show that early interventions may help a child with cerebral palsy, autism spectrum disorder or Down syndrome acquire language skills necessary for social communication to a certain degree.

== Therapies and treatments ==
After the initial diagnosis of speech delay, a hearing test will be administered to ensure that hearing loss or deafness is not an underlying cause of the delay. If a child has successfully completed the hearing test, the therapy or therapies used will be determined. There are many therapies available for children that have been diagnosed with a speech delay, and for every child, the treatment and therapies needed vary with the degree, severity, and cause of the delay. While speech therapy is the most common form of intervention, many children may benefit from additional help from occupational and physical therapies as well. Physical and occupational therapies can be used for a child that has a speech delay due to physical malformations and children that have also been diagnosed with a developmental delay such as autism or a language processing delay. Music therapy has effective results in the fundamentals of speech development, including phonological memory, sentence understanding, sentence memory, and morphological rule generation. Children that have been identified with hearing loss can be taught simple sign language to build and improve their vocabulary in addition to attending speech therapy.

The parents of a delayed child are the first and most important tool in helping overcome the speech delay. The parent or caregiver of the child can provide the following activities at home, in addition to the techniques suggested by a speech therapist, to positively influence the growth of speech and vocabulary:

- Reading to the child regularly
- Use of questions and simple, clear language
- Positive reinforcement in addition to patience

For children that have a physical disorder that is causing difficulty forming and pronouncing words, parents and caregivers suggest using and introducing different food textures to exercise and build jaw muscles while promoting new movements of the jaw while chewing. Another less studied technique used to combat and treat speech delay is a form of therapy using music to promote and facilitate speech and language development. Music therapy is a newer therapy, and has yet to be thoroughly studied and practiced on children with speech delays and impediments.

== See also ==
Syndromes or disorders

- Auditory processing disorder
- Developmental coordination disorder
- Developmental verbal dyspraxia
- Down syndrome
- Speech sound disorder
- Lists of language disorders

General topics

- Bilingualism
- Cleft palate
- Cluttering
- Language acquisition
- Psycholinguistics
