= Glossary of psychiatry =

This glossary covers terms found in the psychiatric literature; the word origins are primarily Greek, but there are also Latin, French, German, and English terms. Many of these terms refer to expressions dating from the early days of psychiatry in Europe; some are deprecated, and thus are of historic interest.

== A ==
=== abreaction ===
Abreaction is a process of vividly reliving repressed memories and emotions related to a past event. Sigmund Freud used hypnosis to rid his patients of pathological memories through abreaction.

=== abulia ===
Aboulia or Abulia, in neurology, refers to a lack of will or initiative. The individual is unable to act or make decisions independently. The condition may range from subtle to overwhelming in severity.

=== achromatopsia ===
Achromatopsia is a term referring to or acquired agnosia for color. This term includes color blindness. Achromatopsia is a condition characterized by a partial or total absence of color vision. People with complete achromatopsia cannot perceive any colors; they see only black, white, and shades of gray. Incomplete achromatopsia is a milder form of the condition that allows some color discrimination.

Achromatopsia also involves other problems with vision, including an increased sensitivity to light and glare (photophobia), involuntary back-and-forth eye movements (nystagmus), and significantly reduced sharpness of vision (low visual acuity). Affected individuals can also have farsightedness (hyperopia) or, less commonly, nearsightedness (myopia). These vision problems develop in the first few months of life.

Achromatopsia is different from the more common forms of color vision deficiency (also called color blindness), in which people can perceive color but have difficulty distinguishing between certain colors, such as red and green.

=== affect illusion ===
Mild illusions or misperceptions associated with changes in mood; e.g. mistaking a shadow for the presence of a person, perceiving movement in peripheral when there is none.

=== akataphasia ===
Akataphasia (Kraepelin 1896) refers to a syntactic disturbance of speech resulting from dissolution of logical ordering of thoughts. It manifests as rambling speech. Compare Derailment.

=== akathisia ===
Akathisia refers to a subjective feeling of restlessness in the lower limbs that is related to abnormal activity in the extrapyramidal system in the brain, often due to antipsychotic medication. It tends to manifest as an inability to sit still.

=== alexithymia ===
Alexithymia refers to an inability to identify and describe emotions in the self.

=== Alice in Wonderland experience ===
In Alice in Wonderland experience, individuals perceive objects (including animals and other humans, or parts of humans, animals, or objects) as appearing substantially smaller than in reality. Generally, the object appears far away or extremely close at the same time. An alternate term for this is somaesthetic aura. Also see § Lilliputian hallucinations

=== alogia ===
Literally, this term means "not having words". The term may refer to either "poverty of speech" or "poverty of thought". In the former, speech, though adequate in verbiage, conveys very little information and may consist of stock phrases or vague references. In poverty of thought, by contrast, there is a far-reaching impoverishment of the entire thinking of the individual, who, as a result, says very little. It is typically a negative symptom of schizophrenia, although it may also be seen in advanced dementia.

=== amenomania ===
Amenomania (compound of Latin amoenus, "cheerful"; and Greek μανία, "madness") is a disused psychiatric diagnosis.

=== amok ===
The phrase "running amok" describes the behavior of an individual who is very agitated and may be at danger of causing harm to themselves or others. The syndrome of "Amok" is found in the DSM-IV TR.

=== anhedonia ===
Anhedonia refers to an inability to experience pleasure, and may be described as a feeling of emotional emptiness. It can be a negative symptom of schizophrenia. It also may be seen in severe depressive states and schizoid personality disorder.

=== anosognosia ===
Anosognosia is a condition in which a person who has a certain disability seems unaware of the existence of their disability. § hemiasomatognosia is a subtype of anosognosia in which the person with hemiplegia neglects one half of their body.

=== Anton's syndrome ===
Anton syndrome, occasionally known as Anton-Babinski syndrome, is a form of cortical blindness in which the individual denies the visual impairment. The individual may attempt to walk, bumping into objects and injuring himself. Anton syndrome is caused by damaging the occipital lobes bilaterally or from disrupting the pathway from the primary visual cortex into the visual association cortex.

=== anwesenheit ===
Anwesenheit refers to the false perception of an unfamiliar presence. It is commonly associated with periods of grief, schizophrenia and other emotional disturbances.

=== apophanous perception ===
This is an alternate term for delusional perception. It is one of the Schneiderian first rank symptoms and is defined as a true perception, to which an individual attributes a false meaning.

=== aphemia ===
Aphemia is the alternate term for mutism. Mutism is absence of speech with apparently normal level of consciousness. Mutism can be dissociative (hysterical) in which an individual (commonly a child or adolescent) stops speaking at once without involvement of any neurological or physical contributing factor; or it can be elective (selective) in which a child does not speak at all in certain situations (such as in school) but speaks well in other conditions (like at home or at play). A rare cause of mutism is akinetic mutism which results due to a lesion around the third ventricle of the brain.

=== apperception ===
Apperception is a normal phenomenon and refers to the ability to understand sensory inputs in their context, to interpret them and to incorporate them into experience. Failure of apperception is seen in delirious states.

=== astasia-abasia ===
Astasia-abasia is a form of psychogenic gait disturbance in which gait becomes impaired in the absence of any neurological or physical pathology. The person usually walks in a bizarre manner. They stagger and appear as if going to fall, but always manage to catch hold of something in time. Sometimes these people cannot even stand, but on the other hand they are well able to move their legs while lying down or sitting. Often associated with conversion disorder or somatization disorder.

=== asyndesis ===
Asyndesis means loosening of association. A milder form of derailment of thought, it is marked by the individual leaping from topic to topic which have only the most tenuous, if any, connection with each other. This is in contrast with § flight of ideas, whereby the individual's successive ideas may be linked and "understandable" to the listener. See also § akataphasia and § entgleisen term introduced by (Cameron).

=== autism ===
From aut = "self" and -ism = "state or orientation". Originally, Eugen Bleuler used this term to describe schizophrenia. In general, it refers to any (pathological) tendency to be self-absorbed to such a degree that the feelings, thoughts and desires of a person are governed by their internal apprehension of the world and not by an external reality shared with others.

Today the term is used most often to refer to a specific developmental syndrome (see autism spectrum).

=== autistic thinking ===
autistic thinking is an outdated term for egocentric thought processes that have little or no relation to consensus reality. The term should not be understood as relating to the thinking styles of autistic people.

=== autochthonous delusion ===
Jaspers defined this as a delusion arising without apparent cause. For example, suddenly, without apparent cause, having the delusional belief that one is an alien.

=== autokabalesis ===
Autokabalesis is a term for committing suicide by jumping from a very high place.

=== automatic obedience ===
Automatic obedience is an exaggerated co-operation with an examiner's request, as if the individual were an "automaton" robotically obeying a command. It is often a sign of catatonia.

=== automatism ===
Automatisms are sequences of activity that occur without conscious control. They may be simple and repetitive (tic-like) or complex, and are usually natural-looking but purposeless. Automatic behavior is not usually recalled afterwards.

=== autoscopy ===
Autoscopy is the reduplicative hallucination of "seeing one's own body from the outside" while still maintaining an egocentric visuo-spatial perspective. Autoscopy is sometimes used synonymously with out-of-body experience.

=== avolition ===
Avolition is an inability to initiate and complete goal-directed behavior. It can sometimes be misinterpreted as laziness, but it is actually a negative symptom of schizophrenia.

== B ==
=== belle indifference ===
Belle indifference or la belle indifférence is characterized by a lack of concern and feeling of indifference about a disability or symptom. It can be seen in conversion disorder.

=== bouffée délirante ===
Bouffée délirante is a French term used in the past for acute and transient psychotic disorders (F23 in ICD-10). In DSM-IV, it is described as "brief psychotic disorder" (298.8). The symptoms usually have an acute onset and reach their peak within two weeks. The symptoms start resolving in a few weeks and complete recovery usually occurs within two or three months.

=== brain fag syndrome ===
Brain fag syndrome is an example of a culture-bound syndrome. "Brain fag" was once a common term for mental exhaustion. Today, the syndrome describes students (predominantly males, particularly in West Africa) experiencing symptoms including somatic, sleep-related and cognitive complaints, head and neck pains, difficulty in concentrating and retaining information, and eye pain.

=== brain fog ===
Synonym of § clouding of consciousness.

=== bruxism ===
Bruxism refers to teeth grinding behavior that is usually seen in children.

== C ==
=== Capgras' syndrome or illusion des sosies ===
In Capgras syndrome, the individual feels that a person familiar to them, usually a family member, has been replaced by an imposter. This is a type of delusion that can be experienced as part of schizophrenia. Capgras syndrome and several other related disorders are referred to as "delusional misidentification syndrome".

=== catalepsy ===
Catalepsy is the term for catatonic rigidity of the limbs which often results in abnormal posturing for long intervals.

=== cataplexy ===
Cataplexy refers to a sudden loss of muscle tone and is commonly precipitated by a strong emotional response.

=== catatonia ===
Catatonia involves a significant psychomotor disturbance, which can occur as catalepsy, stupor, excessive purposeless motor activity, extreme negativism (seemingly motiveless resistance to movement), mutism, echolalia (imitating speech), or echopraxia (imitating movements). There is a catatonic subtype of schizophrenia.

=== cerea flexibilitas ===
Cerea flexibilitas, meaning "waxy flexibility", refers to people allowing themselves to be placed in postures by others, and then maintaining those postures for long periods even if they are obviously uncomfortable. It is characterized by an individual's movements having the feeling of a plastic resistance, as if the person were made of wax. This occurs in catatonic schizophrenia, and a person with this condition can have their limbs placed in fixed positions as if the person were in fact made from wax.

=== chorea ===
Chorea refers to erratic involuntary movements. The term comes from the Greek word "choreia" or "dance" since usually large groups of muscles are involved simulating dance-like movements.

=== circumstantial speech ===
Circumstantial thinking, or circumstantial speech, refers to a person being unable to answer a question without giving excessive, unnecessary detail. This differs from tangential thinking, in that the person does eventually return to the original point, circling back on-topic.

=== clang association ===
Clang associations are ideas that are related only by similar or rhyming sounds rather than actual meaning.

=== Claparede's paradox ===
Claparede's paradox refers to retention of non-verbal and implicit memory in people with Korsakoff's syndrome.

=== clouding of consciousness ===
Clouding of consciousness, also known as brain fog or mental fog, is a global impairment in higher central nervous functioning. All aspects of cognitive functioning are affected. On mental status examinations it is manifest by disorientation in time, place and person, memory difficulties caused by failure to register and recall, aphasia, and agnosia. Impaired perception functioning leads to illusions and hallucinations often in the visual sensory modality. This then causes agitation and distress and secondary delusions. The term confusion state is sometimes used to mean clouding of consciousness, but is avoided whenever possible because it is ambiguous.

=== coenestopathic state ===
Coenestopathic state refers to a situation in which an individual in a coenestopathic state has a localized distortion of body awareness.

=== confabulation ===
Confabulation is the confusion of imagination with memory, or the confusion of true memories with false memories.

=== conversion disorder ===
Conversion disorder involves the unintentional production of symptoms or deficits affecting motor or sensory function that are not fully explained by a neurological or medical condition. This can manifest as paralysis, for example. It generally involves psychological factors, and symptoms may worsen in the context of situational conflict.

=== coprolalia ===
Coprolalia is the involuntary utterance of socially inappropriate phrases. It is a phonic tic associated with Tourette syndrome, although less than 15% of persons with Tourette's have coprolalia.

=== Cotard delusion ===
Cotard delusion involves the belief in an individual that one or more of their organs has changed in some way, has ceased functioning, or has disappeared entirely. This type of delusion is most commonly seen in patients with schizophrenia.

== D ==
=== defenestration ===
Defenestration refers to an individual voluntarily ejecting themselves from a window or another elevated position, usually in the context of attempted suicide. Also see § autokabalesis.

=== déjà vu ===
In déjà vu, a person feels undue familiarity to an event or a person.

=== déjà pensée ===
In déjà pensée, a completely new thought is seen as familiar by an individual, as if it had occurred before. The sensation may be caused by a type of convulsion known as a "partial seizure" which occurs in parts of the temporal lobe or other areas of the brain – typically the individual remains conscious throughout.

=== dementia praecox ===
Dementia praecox refers to a chronic, deteriorating psychotic disorder characterized by rapid cognitive disintegration, usually beginning in the late teens or early adulthood.

=== dementia pugilistica ===
Dementia pugilistica, also called "chronic traumatic encephalopathy", "pugilistic Parkinson's syndrome", "boxer's syndrome", and "punch-drunk syndrome", is a neurological disorder which affects career boxers and others who receive multiple dazing blows to the head. The condition develops over a period of years, with the average time of onset being about 16 years after the start of a career in boxing.

=== derailment ===
Derailment, also known as loosening of associations, refers to disorganized thinking that jumps between ideas that seem entirely unrelated. Compare § akataphasia, § asyndesis, § entgleisen, § flight of ideas, § knight's move thinking, and § logorrhoea. It can be seen in individuals with schizophrenia, as well as those experiencing mania.

=== dereistic thinking ===
Dereistic means: away from reality, undirected fantasy thinking. Carl Jung wrote, "This is the basic activity of psychic life, this fantasy making", and he used the term image not from afterimage, something one has experienced or seen, but says he takes it from poetic usage. Dereistic thinking: An old descriptive term used to refer to thinking not in accordance with the facts of reality and experience and following illogical, idiosyncratic reasoning. This term is also used interchangeably with § autistic thinking though they are not exact synonyms: dereistic emphasizes disconnection from reality and autistic emphasizes preoccupation with inner experience.

=== dermatozoenwahn ===
Alternate term for organic hallucinosis and delusional parasitosis, the continuous belief that one's skin or body has been infested by parasites or insects. This state cannot be diagnosed if the hallucinatory state is produced while the individual is under the influence of drugs or alcohol, or if the individual fulfills the criterion for delirium. In general, if an individual is under the influence of a drug, or experiencing the symptoms of withdrawal from that drug, this condition is not psychiatric but medical, and termed formication.

=== dhat ===
Dhat syndrome refers to a complaint of premature ejaculation or impotence and a false belief that semen is being passed in the urine.

=== doppelgänger ===
The doppelgänger is a phenomenon in which the afflicted believe that their exact "double" is present alongside them all the time and goes with them wherever they go.

== E ==
=== écho de la pensée ===
In écho de la pensée, meaning "thought echo" in French, thoughts seem to be spoken aloud just after being produced. The individual hears the "echo" of their thoughts in the form of a voice after they have made the thought. See also § gedankenlautwerden and § thought sonorization.

=== entgleisen ===
From German entgleisen "to derail". Alternate term used for derailment of thought (a morbid form of loosening of association or asyndesis). A Schneiderian term by origin. In this form of thought the individual jumps from one topic to another during conversation and both topics have literally no connection with each other. This is in contrast with § flight of ideas where connection is present between one topic and another. Compare § akataphasia, § asyndesis, and § derailment.

=== extracampine ===
Extracampine hallucinations are hallucinations beyond the possible sensory field, e.g., an individual "seeing" somebody standing behind them is a visual extracampine hallucination experience.

== F ==
=== fantasy ===
Fantasy is imagining that expresses desires and aims.

=== fatuous affect ===
The moods of an individual with fatuous affect resemble the moods of a child. This condition is seen in hebephrenic schizophrenia.

=== flight of ideas ===
"Flight of ideas" describes excessive speech at a rapid rate that involves causal association between ideas. Links between ideas may involve usage of puns or rhymes. It is typical of mania, classically seen in bipolar disorder. Compare § derailment and Racing thoughts.

=== folie à deux ===
Also called "induced psychosis", folie à deux is a delusional disorder shared by two or more people who are closely related emotionally. One has real psychosis while the symptoms of psychosis are induced in the other or others due to close attachment to the one with psychosis. Separation usually results in symptomatic improvement in the one who is not psychotic.

Folie communiquée, folie imposée, folie induite, and folie simultanée are the four subtypes of folie à deux.

folie communiquée

Folie communiquée, or subtype C of folie à deux, occurs when a normal person has a contagion of their ideas after resisting them for a long time. Once they acquire these beliefs they maintain them despite separation.

folie imposée

Folie imposée, or subtype A of folie à deux, is the most common form in which the dominant person imposes a delusion into a person who was not previously mentally ill. Separation of the two results in improvement of the non-dominant person.

folie induite

In folie induite, or subtype D of folie à deux, a person who is already psychotic adds the delusions of a closely associated person to their own.

folie simultanée

In folie simultanée, or subtype B of folie à deux, a delusional system emerges simultaneously and independently in two closely related persons, and the separation of the two would not be beneficial in the resolution of psychopathology.

=== Fregoli delusion ===
In Fregoli delusion, a person has a delusional belief that various different people are in fact a certain other person, even if there is no physical resemblance.

Fregoli syndrome is considered a form of delusional misidentification "in which the false identification of familiar people occurs in strangers".

== G ==
=== gedankenlautwerden ===
In Gedankenlautwerden, an individual hears thoughts spoken aloud. Thoughts are heard in the form of a voice at the same time as they are thought, not afterwards. See also § écho de la pensée and § thought sonorization

=== gegenhalten ===
Gegenhalten is a catatonic phenomenon in which the subject opposes all passive movements with the same degree of force as applied by the examiner. It is slightly different from § negativism in which the subject does exactly the opposite to what is asked in addition to showing resistance.

== H ==
=== hemiasomatognosia ===
Hemiasomatognosia is a subtype of anosognosia in which the person with hemiplegia neglects one half of their body.

=== hyposchemazia; aschemazia ===
Hyposchemazia is characterized by the reduced awareness of one's body image and aschemazia by the absence of it. These disorders can have many varied causes such as physical injuries, mental disorders, or mental or physical states. These include transection of the spinal cord, parietal lobe lesions (e.g. right middle cerebral artery thrombosis), anxiety, depersonalization, epileptic auras, migraines, sensory deprivation, and vertigo (i.e. "floating on air").

== I ==
=== idée fixe ===
Idée fixe is an alternate term for an overvalued idea. In this condition, a belief that might seem reasonable both to the individual and to other people comes to dominate completely the individual's thinking and life.

=== ideas of alienation ===
Thoughts that one's own body part or action is not of one's own.

=== ideas of influence ===
Thoughts that one's own action is caused by someone else's will or some other external cause.

=== ideas of reference ===
Ideas of reference are a delusional belief that general events are personally directed at oneself.

=== illusion ===
An illusion is a false perception of a detectable stimulus.

== J ==
=== jargon aphasia ===
Jargon aphasia is characterized by incoherent, meaningless speech with neologisms (newly invented words). These are unconscious thoughts that find expression when one is off one's guard and must be consciously repressed.

== K ==
=== Klüver–Bucy syndrome ===
In Klüver–Bucy syndrome, an individual will display placidity, hyperorality, hypersexuality, and hyperphagia. This condition results from bilateral destruction of the amygdaloid bodies of the limbic system.

=== knight's move thinking ===
Knight's move thinking is a complete loosening of associations where there is no logical link between one idea and the next. Based on a knight on a chessboard where the movement can be any L shaped direction, making it difficult to track. Compare § derailment.

=== koro ===
Koro is a culture-specific syndrome, generally seen only among Chinese people. It involves a panicked feeling that one's genitals are retracting into the abdomen, and that this will result in death.

=== kuru ===
Kuru (also known as "laughing sickness" due to the outbursts of laughter that mark its second phase) was first noted in New Guinea in the early 1900s. Kuru is now known to be a prion disease, one of several known transmissible spongiform encephalopathies.

== L ==
=== latah ===
Latah is a culture-specific syndrome usually seen in Southeast Asia and involves startle-induced disorganization, hypersuggestibility, automatic obedience, and echopraxia (a tendency to mimic examiner's or other person's actions). It is usually associated with women. There is controversy over whether Latah is a real psychiatric condition, or merely a display of exhibitionism that would otherwise not be socially acceptable.

=== l'homme qui rit ===
In l'homme qui rit (from the French, meaning "the man who laughs"), an individual displays inappropriate laughter accompanied by release phenomena of the frontal subdominant lobe.

=== Lilliputian hallucinations ===
Lilliputian hallucinations are characterized by abnormal perception of objects as being shrunken in size but normal in detail. Usually seen in delirium tremens.

=== logoclonia ===
In logoclonia, the individual often repeats the last syllable of a word. Compare echolalia. Often a symptom of Alzheimers or Parkinson's disease. Might occur in people with autism.

=== logorrhoea ===
Logorrhoea, also known as "volubility", is characterized by fluent and rambling speech using numerous words. Compare § derailment.

== M ==
=== Mania ===
Mania is often described as a "mirror image" of depression. Mania is a state of abnormally elevated arousal, affect, and energy level. As mania intensifies, irritability can be more pronounced and result in anxiety or violence. Mania symptoms are elevated mood, flights of ideas, pressure of speech, increased energy, decreased need or desire for sleep, and hyperactivity.

=== mania a potu ===
Mania a potu is an alcohol intoxication state with violent and markedly disinhibited behavior. This condition is different from violent behavior in otherwise normal individuals who are intoxicated.

=== metonymy ===
Metonymy is a speech disturbance in which patients, commonly with schizophrenia, use inappropriate words or expressions that are related to the proper ones. Examples include: consume a menu, instead of a meal; lose the piece of string of the conversation, not the thread of the conversation. See also § word approximation.

=== mitgehen ===
Mitgehen (German: [ˈmɪtˌɡeːən]) is an extreme form of mitmachen in which very slight pressure leads to movement in any direction, also called the "anglepoise" effect or "anglepoise lamp sign". This movement occurs despite instructions to resist the pressure, as individuals with this condition often experience even slight pressure as forcible grasping and pushing.

=== mitmachen ===
In mitmachen (German: [ˈmɪtˌmaxn̩]), one's body can be put into any posture, despite instructions given to resist. Compare § mitgehen.

=== moria ===
Moria is the condition characterized by euphoric behavior, such as frivolity and the inability to act seriously. In addition, there is a lack of foresight and a general indifference. It is found in frontal lobe lesions, often along with § witzelsucht, particularly when the orbital surface is damaged. Recent research has shown its presence in frontotemporal dementia.

== N ==
=== negativism ===
Resistance to attempts to move the subject, who then does the opposite of what is asked. Negativism is usually a sign of catatonia, and may progress to (catatonic) rigidity. It is slightly different from § gegenhalten, in which the individual resists movement but does not perform the opposite movement. Also see: oppositional defiance disorder (ODD).

=== neologism ===
In a neurological or psychopathological context, neologisms are nonsensical words or phrases whose origins are unrecognizable, and are associated with aphasia or schizophrenia. Incorrectly constructed words whose origins are understandable may also be called neologisms, but are more properly referred as § word approximations.

== O ==
=== omega sign ===
The omega sign is the occurrence of a fold (like the Greek letter omega, Ω ) in the forehead, above the nose, produced by the excessive action of the corrugator muscle. It is sometimes seen in depression.

=== oneiroid state ===
From Greek oneiros as meaning "dream". In an oneiroid state one feels and behaves as though in a dream. Also known as "oneirophrenia" as described by Ladislas J. Meduna.

=== oneirophrenia ===
See § oneiroid state or oneirophrenia.

=== overvalued idea ===
Overvalued ideas are exaggerated beliefs that a person sustains beyond reasons, but are not as unbelievable and are not as persistently held as delusions. Preoccupation with spouse's possible infidelity can be an overvalued idea if no evidence exists to arouse suspicion. Body dysmorphic disorder's obsessive preoccupation that some aspect of one's own appearance is severely flawed is another example of an overvalued idea.

== P ==
=== palilalia ===
Palilalia is characterized by the repetition of a word or phrase; i.e., the subject continues to repeat a word or phrase after once having said. It is a form of § perseveration.

=== palinacousis ===
In palinacousis the subject continues to hear a word, a syllable or any sound, even after the withdrawal of stimulus. It is a type of § perseveration.

=== palinopsia ===
In palinopsia a visual image persists after the stimulus has gone (similar to an afterimage seen after looking into a bright light).

=== paraphilia ===
Paraphilias are characterized by marked distress over, or acting on, urges to indulge in sexual activity that goes against social norms or that may lead to causing harm to one's self or to others.

=== parapraxis ===
A Freudian slip, or parapraxis, is an error in speech, memory or physical action that is believed to be caused by the unconscious mind.

=== paraprosopia ===
A delusion in which a person believes they have seen a face transform into a grotesque form – often described as a 'monster', 'vampire', 'werewolf' or similar. This is very rare and most likely to be described by people with schizophrenia.

=== paraschemazia ===
Paraschemazia is characterized by a distortion of body image. It can be caused by hallucinogenic drugs such as LSD and mescalin, epileptic auras, and sometimes migraines.

=== pareidolia ===
In pareidolia a vague or random stimulus is mistakenly perceived as recognizable. Pareidolia is a type of illusion and hence called "pareidolic illusion".

=== perseveration ===
This term refers to uncontrollable repetition of a particular response, such as a word, phrase, or gesture, despite the absence or cessation of the original stimulus. Usually it is seen in organic disorders of brain, head injury, delirium or dementia, however can be seen in schizophrenia as well.

=== pfropfschizophrenie ===
This refers to schizophrenia in people with mild learning disabilities.

=== piblokto ===
Piblokto, pibloktoq, or Arctic hysteria, is a condition exclusively appearing in Inuit societies living within the Arctic Circle. Appearing most prevalently in winter, it is considered to be a form of a culture-specific disorder.

Symptoms can include intense "hysteria" (including screaming and uncontrolled wild behavior), depression, coprophagia, and insensitivity to extreme cold. This condition is most often seen in Inuit women.

=== poverty of ideas ===
Often associated with schizophrenia, dementia, and severe depression, poverty of ideas is a thought disturbance in which thought spontaneity and productivity are reduced, and are seen in speech that is vague, has many simple or meaningless repetitions, or full of stereotyped phrases.

=== pseudologia fantastica ===
Pseudologia fantastica is a condition in which a person grossly exaggerates their symptoms or even tells a lie about their symptoms in order to get medical attention. Seen in malingering and Munchausen syndrome.

=== psychological pillow ===
Where the individual holds their head a few centimetres above the bed. No explanation is offered for this. It is a symptom of catatonia and can last for many hours.

=== psychopathology ===
Psychopathology is a term which refers to either the study of mental illness or mental distress or to the manifestation of behaviours and experiences which may be indicative of mental illness or psychological impairment.

== R ==
=== rabbit syndrome ===
Rabbit syndrome is characterized by rapid, vertical, rhythmic movements of lips so that it resembles a rabbit chewing. It is a type of extrapyramidal symptom, distinct from tardive dyskinesia as it spares the tongue and involves vertical movements only.

=== reduplicative hallucination ===
In reduplicative hallucinations there is the perception of seeing a double. Particular kinds of reduplicative hallucination include autoscopy, heautoscopy and out-of-body experiences.

=== reduplicative paramnesia ===
Reduplicative paramnesia is a delusional misidentification syndrome in which one's surroundings are believed to exist in more than one physical location.

=== reflex hallucination ===
Reflex hallucinations occur when true sensory input in one sense leads to production of a hallucination in another sense, e.g. seeing a doctor writing (visual) and then feeling him writing across one's stomach (tactile).

=== restlessness ===
Restlessness has two components: akathisia (subjective "inner" restlessness) and psychomotor agitation (an excess of motor activity).

=== retardation ===
Mental retardation (more commonly referred to as intellectual disability) is a term used when a person has certain limitations in mental functioning and in skills such as communicating, taking care of themselves, and social skills.

In children, these limitations will cause a child to learn and develop more slowly than a typical child. Children with intellectual disability may take longer to learn to speak, walk, and take care of their personal needs such as dressing or eating. They are likely to have trouble learning in school. They will learn, but it will take them longer. There may be some things they cannot learn.

=== left–right disorientation ===
Left–right disorientation is one of the four cardinal signs of Gerstmann's syndrome.

== S ==
=== scanning speech ===
Scanning speech is an ataxic dysarthria in which syllable durations are equalized. It is characteristic of the dysarthria of multiple sclerosis. Together with nystagmus and intention tremor it forms Charcot's triad 1.

=== schizophasia ===
Schizophasia, commonly referred to as word salad, is confused, and often repetitious, language that is symptomatic of various mental illnesses.

=== schnauzkrampf ===
A schnauzkrampf is a grimace resembling pouting sometimes observed in catatonic individuals.

=== sensitiver beziehungswahn ===
Sensitiver beziehungswahn, is an alternate term for ideas of reference. In this the person thinks as people are talking about them or observing them or a talk is going on about them on television or radio. Seen in social phobia, depression, delusional disorder and in schizophrenia where they are often present up to a delusional extent.

=== Stockholm syndrome ===
The Stockholm syndrome is a psychological response sometimes seen in a hostage, in which the hostage exhibits loyalty to the hostage-taker, in spite of the danger (or at least risk) in which the hostage has been placed. Stockholm syndrome is also sometimes discussed in reference to other situations with similar tensions, such as battered person syndrome, child abuse cases, and bride kidnapping.

=== synaesthesiae ===
Also spelled synæsthesia, synaesthesia, or synesthesia—plural synesthesiae, from the Greek syn- meaning "union" and aesthesis meaning "sensation", it is a neurological phenomenon in which two or more bodily senses are coupled.

== T ==
=== telegrammatic or telegraphic speech ===
In telegraphic speech conjunctions and articles are missed out; meaning is retained and few words are used.

=== thought blocking ===
Thought blocking, also referred to as thought withdrawal, refers to an abrupt stop in the middle of a train of thought; the individual might or might not be unable to continue the idea. This is a type of formal thought disorder that can be seen in schizophrenia.

=== thought sonorization ===
A combined term for § gedankenlautwerden and § écho de la pensée ("thought echo").

=== torpor ===
Torpor in psychopathology is usually taken to mean profound inactivity not caused by reduction in consciousness.

=== Tourette syndrome ===
Tourette syndrome (abbreviated as TS or Tourette's) is a common neurodevelopmental disorder that begins in childhood or adolescence. It is characterized by multiple movement (motor) tics and at least one vocal (phonic) tic. Common tics are blinking, coughing, throat clearing, sniffing, and facial movements. These are typically preceded by an unwanted urge or sensation in the affected muscles, can sometimes be suppressed temporarily, and characteristically change in location, strength, and frequency. Tourette's is at the more severe end of a spectrum of tic disorders. The tics often go unnoticed by casual observers.

=== traumatic bonding ===
Traumatic bonding occurs as the result of ongoing cycles of abuse in which the intermittent reinforcement of reward and punishment creates powerful emotional bonds that are resistant to change.

=== trichotillomania ===
Also known as "hair pulling disorder", trichotillomania (TTM) is an impulse control disorder characterised by a long term urge that results in the pulling out of one's hair. This occurs to such a degree that hair loss can be seen. Efforts to stop pulling hair typically fail. Hair removal may occur anywhere; however, the head and around the eyes are most common. The hair pulling is to such a degree that it results in distress.

== V ==
=== verbigeration ===
Verbigeration is a verbal stereotypy (repetition) in which usually one or several sentences or strings of fragmented words are repeated continuously. Sometimes individuals will produce incomprehensible jargon in which stereotypies are embedded. The tone of voice is usually monotonous. This can be produced spontaneously or precipitated by questioning. The term verbigeration was first used in psychiatry by Karl Kahlbaum in 1874, and it referred to a manner of talking which was very fast and incomprehensible. At the time verbigeration was seen as a "disorder of language" and represented a central feature of catatonia. The word is derived from the Latin word verbum (also the source of verbiage), plus the verb gerĕre, to carry on or conduct, from which the Latin verb verbigerāre, to talk or chat, is derived. However, clinically the term verbigeration never achieved popularity and as such has virtually disappeared from psychiatric terminology. Compare Echolalia.

=== verstimmung ===
An ill-humored mood state often accompanied by low mood and depressive symptoms. The people surrounding the individual often feel upset by this condition.

=== vorbeigehen; vorbeireden ===
In vorbeigehen or vorbeireden, an individual will answer a question in such a way that it is clear the question was understood, though the answer itself is very obviously wrong. For example: "How many legs does a dog have?" – "Six". This condition occurs in Ganser syndrome and has been observed in prisoners awaiting trial. Vorbeigehen (German: [foːɐ̯ˈbaɪ̯ˌɡeːən], giving approximate answers) was the original term used by Ganser but Vorbeireden (talking past the point) is the term generally in use (Goldin 1955). This behavior is also seen in people trying to feign psychiatric disorders (hence its association with prisoners).

== W ==
=== wahneinfall ===
Wahneinfall is an alternate term for autochthonous delusions or delusional intuition. This is one of the types of primary delusions in which a firm belief comes into the individual's mind "out of the blue" or as an intuition, hence called "delusional intuition". Other types of primary delusions include delusional mood (or atmosphere), delusional (apophanous) perception and delusional memories. Care is taken not to impugn an otherwise-rational individual's instinctive aversion or inexpressible sense of or belief about a thing by dismissing it as wahneinfall.

=== waxy flexibility ===
Waxy flexibility, also known as § cerea flexibilitas, is characterized by an individual's movements having the feeling of a plastic resistance, as if the person were made of wax. This occurs in catatonic schizophrenia, and a person with this condition can have his limbs placed in fixed positions as if the person were in fact made from wax.

=== waxy rigidity ===
Compare § mitmachen and § waxy flexibility.

=== windigo psychosis ===
Windigo (also wendigo, windago, windiga, witiko, and numerous other variants) psychosis is a culture-bound disorder which involves an intense craving for human flesh and the fear that one will turn into a cannibal. This was alleged to have occurred among Algonquian Indian cultures.

=== witzelsucht ===
Witzelsucht is a tendency to tell inappropriate jokes and create excessive facetiousness and inappropriate or pointless humor. It is seen in frontal lobe disorders usually along with § moria. Recent research has shown that it may also be seen in frontotemporal dementia.

=== word approximation ===
Usage of words in an unconventional or inappropriate way (as in § metonymy), or usage of new but understandable words that are conventionally constructed, contrasting with § neologisms, which are new words whose origins cannot be understood.

=== word-salad ===
Word salad (derived from the German: Wortsalat) is characterized by confused, and often repetitious, language with no apparent meaning or relationship attached to them. It is often symptomatic of various mental illnesses, such as psychoses, including schizophrenia. Compare § derailment.

=== würgstimme ===
Würgstimme refers to speaking in an odd muffled or strangled voice. It is mainly seen in schizophrenia.

== Z ==
=== Zeitraffer ===
Zeitraffer (German: [ˈt͡saɪ̯tˌʁafɐ]) phenomenon, which translates to "time-lapse" in English, highlights how events, objects, and processes change and evolve over time, sometimes in ways that are imperceptible in real-time.

From a philosophical perspective, Zeitraffer can be related to various philosophical themes:

1. Temporality: It raises questions about the nature of time, whether it is continuous or discrete, and how our perception of time affects our understanding of reality.

2. Impermanence: Zeitraffer reminds us of the transient nature of existence, emphasizing how everything is subject to change and decay.

3. Perception and Reality: It underscores the difference between how we perceive the world in real-time and how it actually changes over time, raising questions about the reliability of our senses and the nature of reality.

=== Zeitlupenwahrnehmung ===
Zeitlupenwahrnehmung phenomenon translates to “slow motion perception” in English

=== zoophilia ===
One of the paraphilias, characterized by marked distress over, or acting on, urges to indulge in sexual activity that involves animals.

== See also ==
- Outline of psychiatry
