= Catatonic depression =

Spectrum of mood disorders

- Other names: Catatonic type depression
- Specialty: Psychiatry

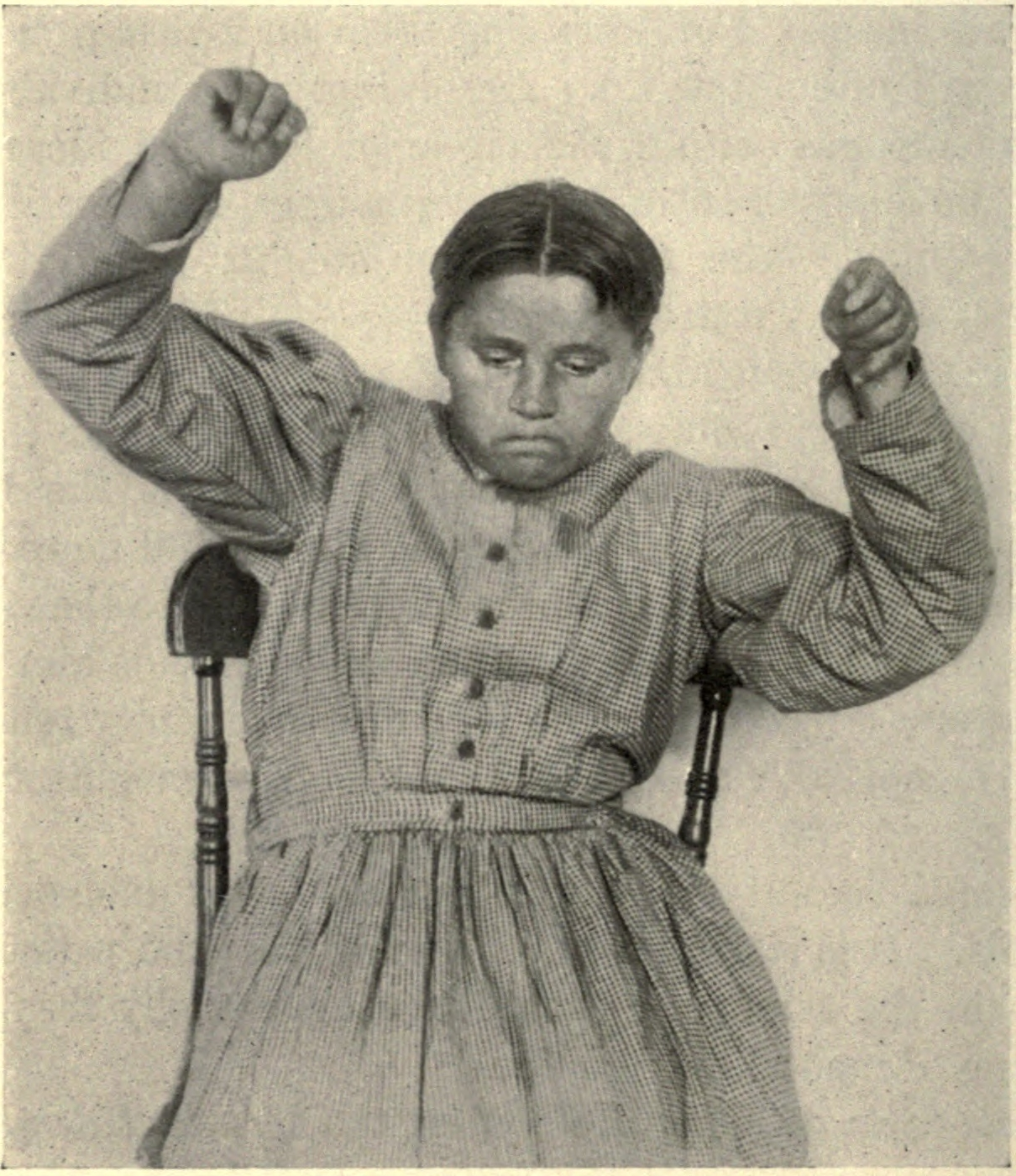
A patient that is diagnosed with catatonic depression.

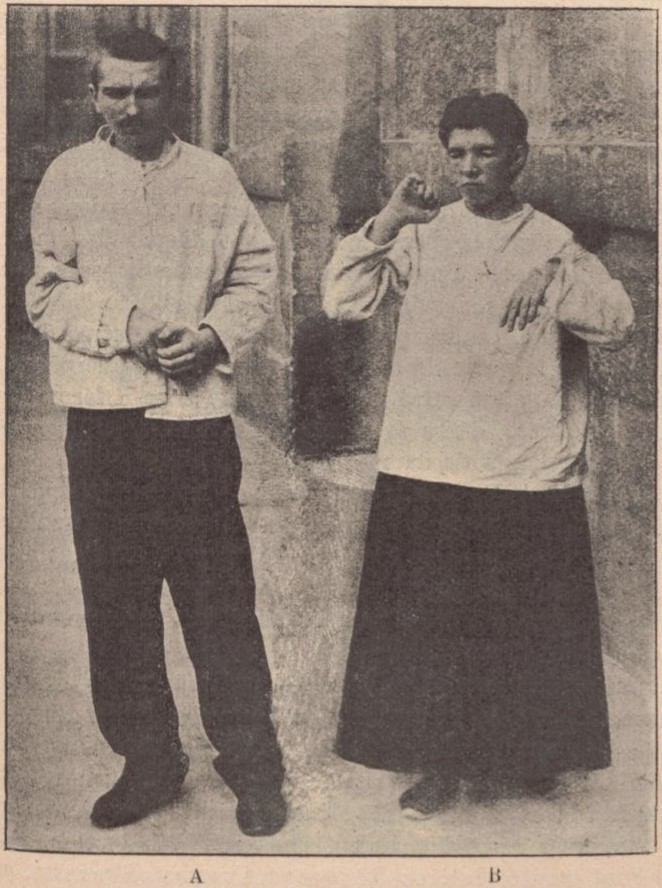
Image showing patients with depressive disorder exemplifying catatonic features

Catatonic depression is characterized as a spectrum of mood disorders and is distinguished by the co-occurrence of catatonia and major depressive disorder (MDD). Catatonic symptoms involve a variety of motor abnormalities and behavioral disturbances, such as stupor, immobility, mutism, negativism, posturing, rigidity, and repetitive or purposeless movements. Individuals suffering from catatonic depression frequently demonstrate a significant decline in their capacity to engage in voluntary behaviors and communicate effectively. These symptoms can significantly impair daily functioning and pose challenges in their personal and professional lives.

The exact cause of catatonic depression is not fully understood. However, it is believed to arise from a complex interplay of genetic, biochemical, and environmental factors. Some research suggests that disturbances in neurotransmitters like dopamine and gamma-aminobutyric acid (GABA) may contribute to the development of catatonic symptoms. Furthermore, stressful life events, trauma, and certain medical disorders can raise the risk of developing this condition. Diagnosing catatonic depression requires a comprehensive evaluation by a qualified mental health professional. The Diagnostic and Statistical Manual of Mental Disorders (DSM-5) has specific criteria for diagnosing catatonic symptoms associated with depression.

Catatonic depression is often treated using a multimodal approach. Antidepressants, mood stabilizers, and antipsychotics may be prescribed to manage depression symptoms and underlying neurotransmitter imbalances. Electroconvulsive therapy (ECT) has also shown effectiveness in treating catatonic depression, particularly in cases where immediate intervention is required if other therapies have been unsuccessful. Individuals can benefit from supportive psychotherapy, cognitive-behavioral therapy (CBT), and psychosocial therapies to cope with symptoms and create management strategies for their illness. Catatonic depression is a debilitating and chronic condition that requires early intervention for optimal treatment. Individuals suffering from catatonic depression can benefit from appropriate treatment and support, resulting in symptom reduction and an improved overall quality of life. Seeking expert help and support is critical to ensuring the patient's accurate diagnosis and treatment.

== Signs and symptoms ==
Catatonic depression is a complex psychiatric condition which involves both major depressive disorder and catatonia. Catatonic depression is characterised by a mix of symptoms and indications that overlap with major depressive disorder and catatonia.

Stupor and mutism are the two most common symptoms. Although symptoms of catatonic depression can vary by individual, common signs of catatonia include grimacing (making a facial expression of pain), negativism, posturing, rigidity, and waxy flexibility.

Major depressive symptoms are also experienced by a person suffering from catatonic depression. These symptoms can include hopelessness, irritability, a loss of interest in or enjoyment from normal activities, sleep disturbances (insomnia or excessive sleeping), exhaustion, anxiety, psychomotor retardation, feelings of worthlessness, difficulty concentrating, difficulty remembering things, and suicidal thoughts.

== Physiological mechanism ==
The pathophysiology of catatonic depression is not currently well understood and mainly shrouded in mystery, but researchers have suggested possible pathophysiology explaining the major depressive disorder coupled with catatonic features.

Gamma-aminobutyric acid (GABA), a vital neurotransmitter of the central nervous system which is known to inhibit nerve transmission.

=== Reduced gamma-aminobutyric acid (GABA) activity ===
GABA-A (GABA type A) receptor activation in the right lateral orbitofrontal and right posterior parietal cortex is suggested to be a plausible cause of catatonia syndrome dysfunction, which helps explain the motor and affective symptoms seen in catatonic individuals. Reduced GABA-A receptor density is found on imaging in cortical regions such as the left sensorimotor cortex, which suggests malfunctioning GABA-A signalling in catatonia.

=== Dopamine dysfunction ===
Dopamine, a neurotransmitter which plays an important role in emotion and movement regulation within the brain.

There is some evidence that blockage of dopamine D2 receptor has led to reduced risk of exacerbating catatonia. This can be seen in neuroleptic malignant syndrome, which has similar symptoms to catatonia.

An alternative idea suggests that the mesostriatal and mesocorticolimbic systems, and the hypothalamus need to maintain a balance between GABA-A and dopamine.

Diagram showcasing activation of NMDA receptor upon binding of excitatory neurotransmitter, glutamate.

=== Glutamate dysfunction ===
Glutamate anomalies have been observed in the basal ganglia (clusters of neurones located in subcortical region) as such excitatory glutamatergic N-methyl-D-aspartate receptors (NMDARs) within this brain region appear to be associated with catatonia. Catatonic symptoms are thought to be caused by glutamate hyperactivity.

There is a high correlation between catatonia and NMDAR encephalitis. (NMDARs are internalised into cells during this inflammatory process, resulting in a drop in the receptor's total abundance.)

=== Abnormalities of the brain and brainstem pathway ===
The disruption of the following three motor pathways is hypothesised to be associated with catatonia.

The first pathway involves the primary motor cortex (M1), putamen, internal and external palladium and thalamus.

The second pathway runs between the M1, thalamus, cerebellum, and pontine nuclei.

The third pathway is composed of the M1, supplementary motor area (SMA), posterior parietal cortex, and medial prefrontal cortex.

It has been shown that individuals with catatonia have more blood flow to the M1 and SMA than those without catatonia. This implies a relation between catatonic depression and elevated neuronal activity in the M1 and SMA.

=== Autoimmune disorders ===
Catatonia is also associated with autoimmune encephalopathies that involves anti-neuronal antibodies (acting on neurones over pathogens). These antibodies become internalised within neurones and cause its dysfunction, leading to catatonic symptoms.

== Causes ==
Genetic susceptibility of an individual has been extensively supported in the case of major depressive disorders. In 2023, the genome-wide association studies (GWAS) have identified 178 genetic risk loci with more than 200 candidate genes. Based on the stress diathesis theory, people with a family history of mood disorder are more prone to developing depression due to stressful life events. However, major depressive disorder is not entirely dependent on genetics and is influenced by other factors.

Research has indicated that there is a 27% chance of a patient developing catatonic symptoms if a first-degree relative has the disorder. Catatonia is also highly heritable. One gene linked to the heredity of catatonia is CNP, which codes for the enzyme cyclic nucleotide phosphodiesterase, which is necessary for myelination and oligodendrocyte function. Depletion of this gene causes the affected mice to develop catatonic depression.

=== Environmental factors ===
Traumatic events and immense stress are well-documented factors of major depressive disorders. Early life trauma is strongly correlated with the onset of mood disorder such as depression as well as the severity and duration of the malady.

However, people with such experience may or may not develop depression while those without impactful life events may also develop major depressive disorder. This could be explained by the gene-environment interaction which influences the impact of life events on the development of a disease. A functional polymorphism of the promoter region of the serotonin transporter gene (5-HTT) was found to moderate the influence of stressful life events on depression.

=== Intense terror ===
Catatonic depression has been possibly associated with extreme fear. Catatonia may be an end-state reaction to emotions of impending doom stemming from early experiences with predators whose attack instincts were focused on movements. A 2020 study on an older population discovered that hyperactivity and nervousness were more common in catatonic patients.

== Diagnosis ==
In order to identify catatonic symptoms in individuals with major depressive disorder, a comprehensive physical and psychological evaluation is part of a diagnostic catatonic depression assessment. Often, people with catatonic depression cannot respond to questions in which case the person's closed ones could be inquired.

=== Clinical assessment ===
It is important for the physician to rule other medical conditions which mimic symptoms of catatonic depression. The physician may take the patient's medical history, including details about symptoms and current medications, perform a thorough physical examination by observing the patient's posture and movements, perform a neurological examination, and order an electroencephalogram (EEG) or magnetic resonance imaging (MRI) to rule out other neurological conditions.

=== DCM and ICD criteria ===
The American Psychiatric Association's Diagnostic and Statistical Manual of Mental Disorders (DSM-5) together with the International Classification of Disease (ICD-11) are generally used to diagnose catatonic depression. Although definitive diagnostic criteria for catatonic depression is still in debate, the two classifications is in agreement for catatonic depression diagnostics.

=== DCM-5 and ICD-11 classification ===
To diagnose catatonic depression, it requires the presence of 3 of the following 12 clinical signs, which includes stupor (impaired responsiveness indicated by a lack of movement and speech), catalepsy (a lack of response to external stimuli due to muscular rigidity), waxy flexibility (resistance to repositioning after being moved), mutism (being unable or unwilling to speak), negativism (resistance to suggestions or instructions), posturing (holding an abnormal position for an extended period), mannerisms (involve an unusual, exaggerated, or peculiar way of performing a normal action like movement or speech), stereotypies (these behaviors include repetitive, non-goal-directed movements and speech, disrupting normal functioning), psychomotor agitation (increased movement, restlessness, and irritability coupled with enhanced responsiveness to internal and external stimuli), grimacing (making a facial expression of pain), echolalia (mimicking another person's speech) and echopraxia (mimicking another person's movements or behaviors for no reason).

=== Misdiagnosis ===
Major depressive disorder subtype catatonia can be easily overlooked which could result in misdiagnosis and thus worsen the patient's condition. Therefore, physicians ought to be cautious when diagnosing major depressive disorder and consider the possible subtypes.

== Managements ==
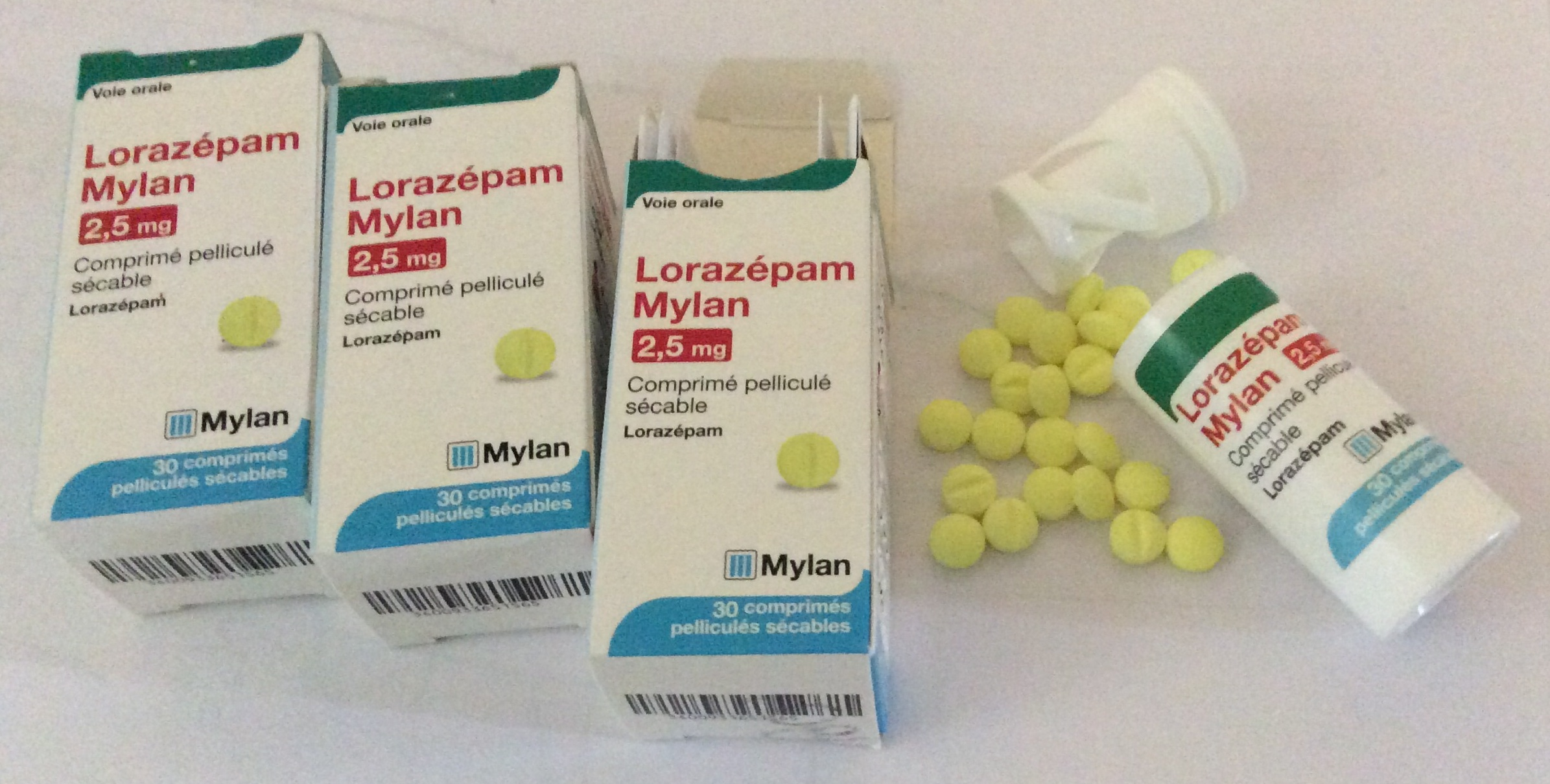
Lorazepam, belongs to group of medicine named benzodiazepines. It is a commonly used medicine to treat anxiety disorders.

Catatonic depression is a severe but manageable subtype of depression. Benzodiazepines, such as lorazepam, are often prescribed as the first-line treatment for catatonia. These medications contain anxiety-relieving and muscle relaxing characteristics.

=== Combination therapy ===
Antipsychotic medications can be combined with benzodiazepines to treat catatonic depression. Combination therapy can help relieve symptoms and enhance overall function. When medication alone is ineffective, the use of electroconvulsive therapy (ECT) is recommended. ECT is the use of electrical currents to produce a seizure while under general anesthesia. It is thought to reset brain chemistry and may be beneficial in treating severe mental illnesses, including catatonia.

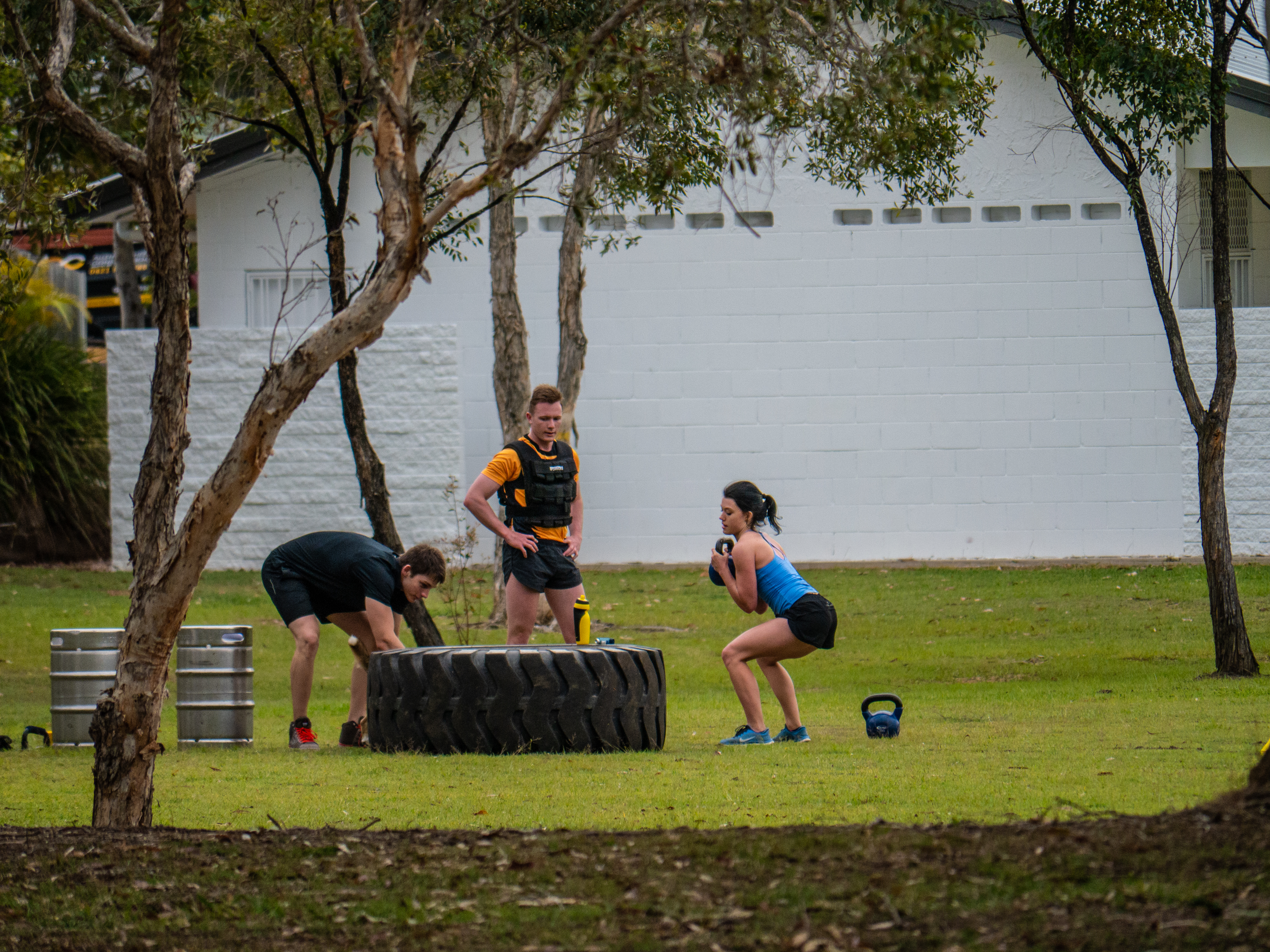
Exercising is shown to be beneficial to reduce symptoms of catatonic depression.

=== Lifestyle ===
It is suggested to create a scheduled daily regimen that includes consistent sleep, meals, and activities that can provide a sense of stability and manage symptoms better. It is also recommended to engage in regular physical activity, such as walking, yoga, or swimming, as exercise has been demonstrated to elevate mood and lessen symptoms of depression.

=== Psychotherapies ===
Supportive treatment can be effective in resolving underlying depression and assisting patients in coping with symptoms. A person suffering from catatonic depression requires acute psychiatric care, which includes contacting an inpatient mental facility or seeking emergency medical attention to ensure that the person receives therapy as soon as possible.

== Epidemiology ==
Catatonic depression is underdiagnosed and may impact up to 38% of acute psychiatric patients, as it creates particular symptoms as indicated above and necessitates a specific treatment approach with an emphasis on medications to relieve symptoms. Catatonia affects over 10% of all persons hospitalized to psychiatric facilities. Catatonia may be associated with depression, although it also affects approximately 20% of persons with autism spectrum disorder, and up to 50% of catatonia instances are caused by medical difficulties.

Catatonic depression is frequently associated with other mental health illnesses, including bipolar disorder, schizophrenia, major depressive disorder, mood disorders, personality disorders, and anxiety disorders.

== See also ==
- Schizophrenia
- Major Depressive Disorder
- Catatonia
- Mood Disorder
- Autism Spectrum Disorder
- Personality Disorder
