= Jumping Frenchmen of Maine =

Group of men with unusual behavioral symptoms

- Specialty: Medical genetics

The Jumping Frenchmen of Maine were a group of 19th-century lumberjacks who exhibited a rare disorder of unknown origin. The syndrome entails an exaggerated startle reflex which may be described as an uncontrollable "jump". Individuals with this condition could exhibit sudden movements in all parts of the body. Jumping Frenchmen syndrome shares some symptoms with other startle disorders.

Individuals with this condition were first found in the Moosehead Lake region of Maine, and were first described by George Miller Beard in 1878.

== Signs and symptoms ==
George Miller Beard recorded individuals who would obey any command given suddenly, even if it meant striking a loved one; the Jumping Frenchmen seemed to react abnormally to sudden stimuli. The more common and less intense symptoms consisted of jumping, yelling, and hitting. These individuals exhibited outrageous bursts, and many described themselves as ticklish and shy. Other cases involved echolalia (repeating vocalizations made by another person) and echopraxia (repeating movements made by another person). Beard noted that the men were "suggestible" and that they "could not help repeating the word or sounds that came from the person that ordered them any more than they could help striking, dropping, throwing, jumping, or starting".

== Causes ==
The cause of Jumping Frenchmen syndrome is unknown. One theory is that it is a genetic condition. An observation of 50 cases found the disorder to be remotely located and concentrated in the northern regions of Maine. Fourteen of these cases were found in four families. Another set of cases were found in a single family where the father, his two sons, and his two grandchildren exhibited "jumping" behavior.

It may also be a culture-bound syndrome, mass psychogenic illness, or a formed habit. These French "jumpers" lived in a very remote region and most were lumberjacks. This type of small community would allow for a majority to adapt to this sort of reaction. Also, instances of many being shy may imply that the "jumper" was positively reinforced by the sudden attention as the entertainment for a group.

In 1885, Georges Gilles de la Tourette included Jumping Frenchmen syndrome in the typology of "convulsive tic illness"; studies of the condition in the 1980s cast doubt on whether the phenomenon was in fact a physical condition similar to Tourette syndrome. Documentation of direct observation of "Jumping Frenchmen" has been scarce, and while video evidence was recorded by several researchers that showed the condition to be real, MH and JM Saint-Hilaire concluded from studying eight affected people that it was brought on by conditions at their lumber camps and was psychological, not neurological.

== Differential diagnosis ==
Jumping Frenchmen of Maine syndrome must be distinguished from other conditions involving the startle reflex or tics.

Tourette syndrome is characterized by multiple physical (motor) tics and at least one vocal (phonic) tic. There are many overlaps when compared clinically, but the abnormal "jumping" response is always provoked, unlike the involuntary tics in Tourette syndrome.

=== Similar conditions ===
- Latah is a disorder found in southeast Asia in which one's startle response is similar to a state of trance with repetitive speech or movements.
- Meryachenie is a disorder found in Siberia that also displays an action similar to "jumping".
- Neurasthenia is a disorder with a startle response during periods of great fatigue.
- Hyperekplexia is a rare autosomal dominant neurological disease. The symptoms begin in infancy with hypertonia, an abnormal muscle tension that decreases flexibility, and an exaggerated startle in all ages of life.

== History ==
Beard had a unique interest in unusual disorders and took the opportunity to observe the epidemic in Maine. He recorded "startle, jumping, and tic-like behaviors" among the French Canadians and lumberjacks who lived near Moosehead Lake in northern Maine. He published his descriptions of the Jumping Frenchmen in 1880, and he believed the condition was hereditary. History of Medicine professor Howard I. Kushner calls Beard's description "the most influential and detailed study" of these behaviors.

According to Kushner, the French physician Jean-Martin Charcot chose his resident, Georges Gilles de la Tourette, to investigate the "relationship between tic disorders and jumping and startle behaviors reported in Malaysia, Siberia, and Maine"; Gilles de la Tourette translated Beard's descriptions and published them one year after Beard's papers. In 1885, Tourette published "Study of a Nervous Affliction" where he included the startle disorders in the typology of what he called "convulsive tic illness", that included what later came to be known as Tourette syndrome. Kushner argues that none of the patients studied by Tourette supported this assertion, and says that "many of his contemporaries refuted Gilles de la Tourette's typology".
