= Delusional intuition =

Type of mental illusion

Delusional intuition is an illusion in the context of the intuitive rather than an experience of false intuition. The person experiences something that resembles the intuitive, but instead, the experience is qualified as delirious. This illusion is also described as autochthonous.

This description, in abnormal behavior, and communicated in abnormal speech, is translated from the German Wahneinfall. Delusional is, specifically, a false, capricious or whimsical opinion.

Delirious intuition is a relevant term for the fields of psychiatry and psychology and describes the expression of thoughts that have no apparent basis in inference. It usually happens in a clinical setting, is apparently impossible or improbable in the sense that the semantic relationships of the subjects within the content of speech they have no basis in reality, that is, it is from a thought that is delirious.

== Description ==
This description of a psychological phenomenon, that is as observed in the form of expression within behaviour abnormally, and communicated in abnormal speech, is translated from the German Wahneinfall. Wahn translated is specifically a whimsy, false opinion, or fancy.

It is a term relevant to the fields of psychiatry and psychology, since it describes the expression of thought(s) that have no apparent basis in inference. A phenomenological understanding is of an occurrence that is very much like the expression of the spontaneous occurrence of an inspirational idea, sprung from the soil, translated into a delusionary vehicle with the conviction of "immediate enlightenment" (Leon et al 1989) that occurs as a delire d'emblée i.e. complete in the actual instance. The delusion defined as autochthonous in this context is known as primary (Jaspers 1963).

== Occurrence ==
The delusion is found described in clinical settings as a description of medical symptom of the psychotic illness known as schizophrenia, and is known within that milieu as a first rank symptom The delusional ideation sometimes occurs from a prior delusional mood (Fish 1985). According to the Klaus Conrad 1958 account, grātia gratiam parit, the delusion occurs as a second order development of earlier delusionary thinking.

== See also ==
- Glossary of psychiatry
