= Latah =

Culture-bound mental illness

Latah (from Malay word) is a condition in which abnormal behaviors result from a person experiencing a sudden shock or other external stressor almost exclusively having been observed in persons from Malaysia, Indonesia, and other Southeast Asian countries. When induced, the affected person typically engages in such behaviors as screaming, cursing, dance movements, uncontrollable laughter, imitating speech, imitating behavior and command obedience. Physical symptoms include an increased heart rate and profuse sweating, but no clear physiological causality beyond the apparent relationship between sudden shock and/or severe emotional stress have been identified. Since no research has emerged indicating whether the behavior is caused by a genetic disorder unique to those of Southeast Asian ancestry, a set of psychosomatic symptoms triggered by Southeast Asian cultural anthropological factors, or another cause not yet hypothesized, the cause has remained undetermined.

Latah was initially considered a culture-specific startle disorder that was historically regarded as personal difference rather than an illness. Similar conditions have been recorded within other cultures and locations. For example, there are the so-called Jumping Frenchmen of Maine, imu among women of the Ainu people of Japan, mali-mali or silok among Filipinos, and bat-schi (บ้าจี้) among Thais; however, the connection among these syndromes is controversial.

== Earliest record ==
The earliest mention of latah is in J. R. Logan's journal from 1849 when he traveled from Melaka to Naning. Though this is only a possible reference, by the 1860s, latah had been clearly identified in Malaya and Java. Seen first as merely a "cerebral affection", little was understood about latah during this time. O'Brien's notes from the early- to mid-1880s are the first gathering of information on latah recorded. He observed that latah was more common in women than men, and more likely to occur in more mature, rather than younger, women. From many of the original accounts of European travelers, latah does not seem to have changed much in either affected demographic population nor in symptoms.

The British colonial administrator Frank Swettenham wrote about latah in his volume of essays Malay Sketches (1895). Swettenham describes how two policemen from Ambon Island stationed in Selangor in 1874 who were affected with the condition were made the victims of pranks by their colleagues.

== Signs and symptoms ==
Latah can affect people differently; someone can have a very strong reaction or a slight reaction during a latah episode. Every instance of latah has been acquired over time. Those who are affected, which by an overwhelming number are middle-aged to older women, are not born with latah. It typically occurs around the time of menopause. There is a lack of latah in the higher social strata of Malay and Java, which suggests they are more likely to suppress their responses than those who belong to lower social classes.

A latah episode occurs after being startled (poking, shouting, something falling). During an episode, a latah person will begin to shout obscenities, imitate words or gestures of those around them or even those on TV, and will often obey any commands given to them – no matter how outrageous or against cultural norms they are. Persons with latah make movements reminiscent of behaviors normally peculiar to certain childhood developmental stages. The person is unlikely to remember anything occurring during the episode.

== Malay perspective ==
When Malays were asked why they thought that women were more likely to suffer from latah, they responded with the cultural explanation that women have less "semangat" or soul substance. They also said women are simply easier to tease than men, and coupling these two together, latah becomes more readily observable and developed throughout recurrent provocation in women than in men. This also accounts for the higher prevalence of latah in lower status persons, as they are more vulnerable to abuse than others. The Malay also believe women are more susceptible because they lose more blood than men, through menstruation. Some Malay believe that excess tickling of a child will predispose them to latah later in life.

In Kamus Dewan, an authoritative Malay dictionary with definitions in Malay, melatah is defined as "to involuntarily say or do things because of surprise".

== In the DSM ==
Latah was included in Diagnostic and Statistical Manual of Mental Disorders (DSM) IV under the "Dissociative Disorder: Not Otherwise Specified" section as a culture-bound syndrome. DSM IV describes latah as a hypersensitivity to sudden fright, often with echopraxia, echolalia, command obedience, and dissociative or trancelike behavior. It mentions other cultures where latah is found, but the only further information the DSM-IV provides is that in Malaysia, it is more often found in middle-aged women. It has been removed from DSM-5, and rather than the DSM-5 expanding upon the DSM IV's list of culture-bound syndromes, it has instead provided cross-lists for more commonly known disorders that a culture-bound syndrome might be classified as. DSM-5 has taken out the "culture-bound syndrome" language and replaced it with more "sensitive" language, and the glossary where the now shortened list of previously recognized culture-bound syndromes is titled "Other Specified" and "Unspecified" dissociative disorders. A more general discussion, involving the formation of a cultural identity, explanation, and assessment, has been added.

== In popular culture ==
William S. Burroughs mentions latah several times in his 1959 novel Naked Lunch, "a parody of modern mass man under modern conditioning programmes of advertising and public[ly] induced morality", according to Eric Mottram. Burroughs described latah as involving echopraxia, as well as being forcibly induced rather than spontaneously occurring. Latah is also mentioned in Burroughs' 1963 novel The Yage Letters.

== Possible causes ==
The onset of latah is often associated with stress. In a study done by Tanner and Chamberland in 2001, a significant number of research participants had experienced a life stressor (such as a child or husband dying) just before becoming latah. Additionally, a large number of participants from many research studies have reported strange dreams occurring just before the onset of latah. These dreams usually had a sexual element to them, often involving penises. According to Tanner and Chamberland, perhaps the dreams, although with variation, indicate some sort of dysfunction in a specific anatomical area. Exploring this further might lead to more insights as to the cause and/or cure of latah. Osborne (2001) states that latah is a possible emotional outlet in a stifling culture. Winzeler's believes that latah is less demeaning for women than it is for men, and that women actually have more freedom in society because they are not held to as strict of standards as men are. He argues that as men age, they become more concerned with personal dignity and poise while women become less so. Because of this, women feel more freedom to engage in latah behavior, while men do not.

== See also ==
- Hyperekplexia – Genetic disorder causing an exaggerated startle response
- Tic – Sudden movement or vocalization
- Tourette syndrome – Neurodevelopmental disorder involving motor and vocal tics
