= Echophenomenon =

Automatic imitative actions

Echophenomenon (also known as echo phenomenon; from Ancient Greek ἠχώ (ēkhṓ) "echo, reflected sound") is "automatic imitative actions without explicit awareness" or pathological repetitions of external stimuli or activities, actions, sounds, or phrases, indicative of an underlying disorder.

The echophenomena include repetition:

- echolalia (syn. echophrasia) – of vocalizations (the most common of the echophenomena)
  - echopalilalia – of words
  - echothanatologia - of words centered on death, described in a review of grief in the context of neurodevelopmental disorders
- echopraxia (syn. echokinesis, echomatism) – of actions, movements
  - echothanatopraxia - of actions related to the cause of death
- echopathy – of actions or speech
- echoplasia – physically or mentally, tracing contours of objects
- echolalioplasia – involving sign language, described in one individual with Tourette syndrome (as of 2012).
