= Charcot's neurologic triad =

Triad of clinical signs associated with multiple sclerosis

- Differential diagnosis: Multiple sclerosis

Charcot's neurologic triad (English: /ʃɑːrˈkoʊ/ shar-KOH, French: [ʃaʁko]) is the combination of nystagmus, intention tremor, and scanning or staccato speech. This triad is associated with multiple sclerosis, where it was first described; however, it is not considered pathognomonic for it. It is named after Jean-Martin Charcot.

== See also ==
- Charcot's triad
