= Sensory ataxic neuropathy, dysarthria, and ophthalmoparesis =

- Specialty: Medical genetics
- Prevention: none
- Frequency: very rare, only 29 cases have been described in medical literature
- Deaths: -

Sensory ataxic neuropathy, dysarthria, and ophthalmoparesis, also known as SANDO syndrome, is a very rare genetic disorder which is characterized by ocular and nerve anomalies.

== Signs and symptoms ==
This disorder is characterized by the adult-onset triad consisting of the following symptoms: sensory ataxic neuropathy, dysarthria, and ophthalmoparesis. MRIS often reveals white matter abnormalities and bilateral thalamus lesions. Other symptoms include generalized myopathy, epilepsy, and deafness.

== Causes ==
It is caused by autosomal recessive mutations in the POLG gene.

== Epidemiology ==
According to OMIM, approximately 29 cases have been described in medical literature. Most of these cases came from Europe.
