= Amenomania =

Psychiatric condition

Amenomania (compound of Latin amoenus, "cheerful"; and Greek μανία, "madness") is a disused psychiatric diagnosis that originally designated patients with delusional disorders which do not paralyse them, but who may have fixed bizarre delusions. In some cases, religious delusion might accompany, causing individuals to believe themselves to have peculiar spiritual powers, or to even be God, often characterising outlines which might be diagnosed by modern psychiatry as paranoid schizophrenia or bipolar disorder.

According to Benjamin Rush, amenomania would be a higher form of hypochondriasis, in which the patient, instead of having anxiety upon non-existent diseases, would deny any imperfection in his health, being not melancholic about his mental abnormalities, but rather cheerful (hence the name of the condition).

== Bibliography ==
- Rush, Benjamin (1835) [1815], Medical Inquiries and Observations upon Diseases of the Mind (PDF) (5 ed.), Philadelphia: John Grigg, pp. 133–8, archived from the original (PDF) on 8 August 2017
