= Mesostriatal system =

The Mesostriatal system is a term sometimes used to identify the midbrain dopamine projections into the striatum and cortex. It has been described as a combination of the mesolimbic and nigrostriatal dopamine projections, and has been described as being partially asymmetric.

== Research ==
It has been referred to in the context of α-melanocyte stimulating hormones effect on dopamine activity in the mesostriatal system. Research identifying cholinergic projections into these mesostriatal nuclei have been performed, revealing that the midbrain dopaminergic nuclei receive projections from the pedunculopontine tegmentum and laterodorsal pontine tegmentum. The mesostriatal system has also been implicated in reward learning, coding predictions. This anatomical classification has also been used in the context of parkinson research.
