= Intention tremor =

- Other names: Cerebellar tremor
- Specialty: Neurology

Intention tremor is a dyskinetic disorder characterized by a broad, coarse, and low-frequency (below 5 Hz) tremor evident during deliberate and visually-guided movement (hence the name intention tremor). An intention tremor is usually perpendicular to the direction of movement. When experiencing an intention tremor, one often overshoots or undershoots one's target, a condition known as dysmetria. Intention tremor is the result of dysfunction of the cerebellum, particularly on the same side as the tremor in the lateral zone, which controls visually guided movements. Depending on the location of cerebellar damage, these tremors can be either unilateral or bilateral.

Several causes have been discovered to date, including damage or degradation of the cerebellum due to neurodegenerative diseases, trauma, tumor, stroke, or toxicity. Currently, no pharmacological treatment has been established, but some success has been seen using treatments designed for essential tremors.

== Signs and symptoms ==
Patients with intention tremors usually complain of difficulties with activities of daily living, including drinking from a cup, grabbing utensils to eat, and problems with coordination eye to an object or ambulation. Associated cerebellar signs can include nystagmus, dysmetria, dysdiadochokinesia, hypotonia, proprioception deficits, and gait ataxia.

== Causes ==
Intention tremors are common among individuals with multiple sclerosis (MS). One common symptom of MS is ataxia, a lack of coordinated muscle movement caused by cerebellar lesions characteristic of MS. The disease often destroys physical and cognitive function of individuals. Intention tremors can be a first sign of MS, since loss or deterioration of motor function and sensitivity are often one of the first symptoms of cerebellar lesions.

Intention tremors have a variety of other recorded causes, as well, including a variety of neurological disorders, such as stroke, cerebral palsy, alcoholism, alcohol withdrawal, peripheral neuropathy, Wilson's disease, Creutzfeldt–Jakob disease, Guillain–Barré syndrome, and fragile X syndrome, as well as brain tumors, low blood sugar, hyperthyroidism, hypoparathyroidism, insulinoma, normal aging, and traumatic brain injury. Holmes tremor, a rubral or midbrain tremor, is another form of tremor that includes intention tremors, among other symptoms. This disease affects the proximal muscles of the head, shoulders, and neck. Tremors of this disease occur at frequencies of 2–4 Hz or more.

Intention tremor is also known to be associated with infections, such as West Nile virus, rubella, H. influenza, rabies, and varicella. A variety of poisons have been shown to cause intention tremor, including mercury, methyl bromide, and phosphine. In addition, vitamin deficiencies have been linked to intention tremor, especially deficiency in vitamin E. Pharmacological agents such as anti-arrhythmic drugs, anti-epileptic agents, benzodiazepine, cyclosporine, lithium, neuroleptics, and stimulants have been known to cause intention tremor. Some ordinary activities, including ingesting too much caffeine, cigarettes, and alcohol, along with stress, anxiety, fear, anger, and fatigue have also been shown to cause intention tremor by negatively affecting the cerebellum, brainstem, or thalamus, as discussed in mechanisms.

== Mechanism ==
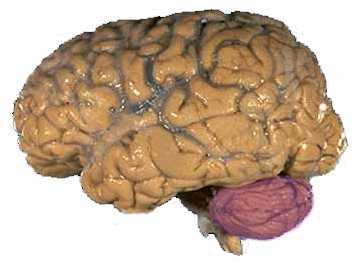
The cerebellum is highlighted in purple.

Intention tremors that are caused by normal, everyday activities, such as stress, anxiety, fear, anger, caffeine, and fatigue, do not seem to result from damage to any part of the brain. These tremors, instead, seem to be a temporary worsening of a small tremor that is present in every human being. These tremors generally go away with time.

More persistent intention tremors are often caused by damage to certain regions of the brain. Their most common cause is damage and/or degeneration in the cerebellum, the part of the brain responsible for motor coordination, posture, and balance, and especially fine motor movements. When the cerebellum is damaged, a person may have difficulty executing a fine motor movement, such as attempting to touch one's nose with one's finger. One common way for the cerebellum to become damaged is through the development of cerebellar lesions. The most common site for cerebellar lesions that lead to intention tremors has been reported to be the superior cerebellar peduncle, through which all fibers carrying information to the midbrain pass, and the dentate nucleus, which is also responsible for linking the cerebellum to the rest of the brain. Alcohol abuse is one typical cause of this damage to the cerebellum. The alcohol abuse causes degeneration of the anterior vermis of the cerebellum. This leads to an inability to process fine motor movements in the individual and the development of intention tremors. In MS, damage occurs due to demyelination and neuron death, which again produce cerebellar lesions and an inability for those neurons to transmit signals. Because of this tight association with damage to the cerebellum, intention tremors are often referred to as cerebellar tremors.

Intention tremors can also be caused as a result of damage to the brainstem or thalamus. Both of these structures are involved in the transmission of information between the cerebellum and the cerebral cortex, and between the cerebellum and the spinal cord, and then on to the motor neurons. When these become damaged, the relay system between the cerebellum and the muscle upon which it is trying to act is compromised, resulting in the development of a tremor.

== Diagnosis ==
A working diagnosis is made from a neurological examination and evaluation. Parts of a complete examination include a physical examination, magnetic resonance imaging (MRI), patient history, and electrophysiological and accelerometric studies. A diagnosis of solely intention tremor can only be made if the tremor is of low frequency (below 5 Hz) and without the presence of any resting tremors. Electrophysiological studies can be useful in determining frequency of the tremor, and accelerometric studies quantify tremor amplitude. MRI is used to locate damage to and degradation of the cerebellum that may be causing the intention tremor. Focal lesions such as neoplasms, tumors, hemorrhages, demyelination, or other damage may be causing dysfunction of the cerebellum and correspondingly the intention tremor.

Physical tests are an easy way to determine the severity of the intention tremor and impairment of physical activity. Common tests that are used to assess intention tremor are the finger-to-nose and heel-to-shin tests. In a finger-to-nose test, a physician has the individual touch their nose with their finger while monitoring for irregularity in timing and control of the movement. An individual with intention tremors has coarse side-to-side movements that increase in severity as the finger approaches the nose. Similarly, the heel-to-shin test evaluates intention tremors of the lower extremities. In such a test, the individual, in a supine position, places one heel on top of the opposite knee and is then instructed to slide the heel down the shin to the ankle while being monitored for coarse and irregular side-to-side movement as the heel approaches the ankle. Important historical elements to the diagnosis of intention tremor are:

- Age at onset
- Mode of onset (sudden or gradual)
- Anatomical affected sites
- Rate of progression
- Exacerbating and remitting factors
- Alcohol abuse
- Family history of tremor
- Current medications

Secondary symptoms commonly observed are dysarthria (a speech disorder characterized by poor articulation and slurred speech), nystagmus (rapid involuntary eye movement, especially rolling of the eyes), gait problems (abnormality in walking), and postural tremor or titubation (to-and-fro movements of the neck and trunk). A postural tremor may also accompany intention tremors.

== Management ==
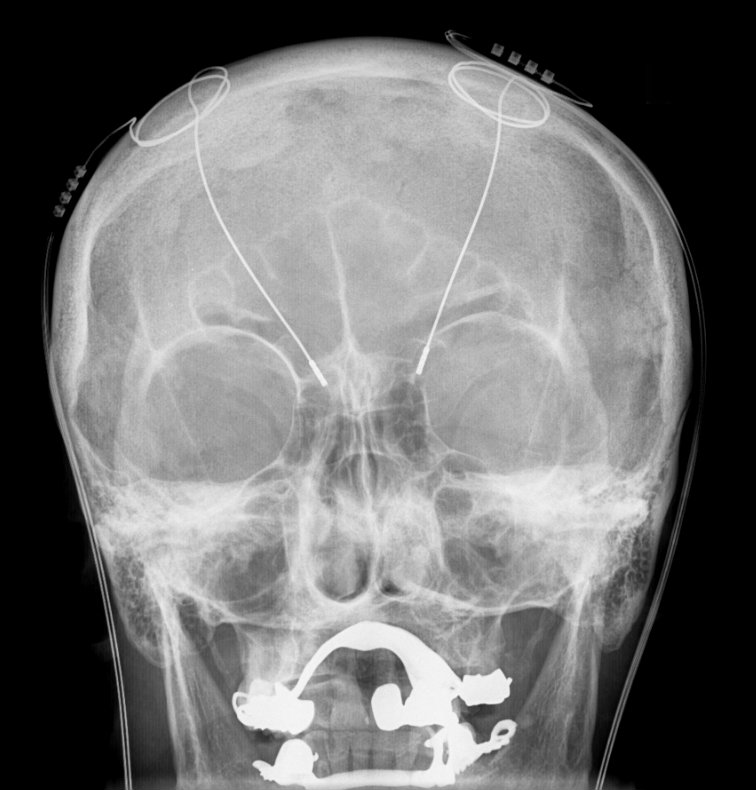
A radiography during an intervention of deep brain stimulation

Treatment of intention tremor is very difficult. The tremor may disappear for a while after a treatment has been administered and then return. This situation is addressed with a different treatment. First, individuals are asked if they use any of the drugs known to cause tremors. If so, they are asked to stop taking the medication, and then are evaluated after some time to determine if the medication was related to the onset of the tremor. If the tremor persists, treatment that follows may include drug therapy, lifestyle changes, and more invasive forms of treatment, including surgery such as and thalamic deep brain stimulation.

Intention tremors are known to be very difficult to treat with pharmacotherapy and drugs. Although no pharmacological treatment has been established for an intention tremor, several drugs have been found to have positive effects on them and are used as treatment by many health professionals. Isoniazid, buspirone hydrochloride, glutethimide, carbamazepine, clonazepam, topiramate, zofran, propranolol, and primidone have all seen moderate results in treating intention tremor and can be prescribed treatments. Isoniazid inhibits γ-aminobutyric acid-aminotransferase, which the first step in enzymatic breakdown of GABA, thus increasing GABA, the major inhibitory neurotransmitter in the central nervous system. This causes a reduction in cerebellar ataxia. Another neurotransmitter targeted by drugs that has been found to alleviate intention tremors is serotonin. The agonist buspirone hydrochloride, which decreases serotonin's function in the central nervous system, has been viewed as an effective treatment of intention tremors.

Physical therapy has had great results in reducing tremors, but usually does not cure them. Relaxation techniques, such as meditation, yoga, hypnosis, and biofeedback, have seen some results with tremors. Wearing wrist weights to weigh down one's hands as they make movements, masking much of the tremor, is a proven home remedy. This is not a treatment, since wearing the weights does not have any lasting effects when they are not on, but they do help the individual cope with the tremor immediately.

A more radical treatment that is used in individuals who do not respond to drug therapy, physical therapy, or any other treatment listed above, with moderate to severe intention tremors, is surgical intervention. Deep brain stimulation and surgical lesioning of the thalamic nuclei has been found to be an effective long-term treatment with intention tremors.

Deep brain stimulation treats intention tremors, but does not help related diseases or disorders such as dyssynergia and dysmetria. Deep brain stimulation involves the implantation of a device called a neurostimulator, sometimes called a "brain pacemaker". It sends electrical impulses to specific parts of the brain, changing brain activity in a controlled manner. In the case of an intention tremor, the thalamic nuclear region is targeted for treatment. This form of treatment causes reversible changes and does not cause any permanent lesions. Since it is reversible, deep brain stimulation is considered fairly safe. Reduction in tremor amplitude is almost guaranteed and sometimes resolved. Some individuals have seen sustained benefits in MS progression.

Thalamotomy is another surgical treatment where lesions of the thalamic nucleus are created to disrupt the tremor circuit. Thalamotomy has been used to treat many forms of tremors, including those that arise from trauma, MS, stroke, and those whose cause is unknown. This is a very invasive, high-risk treatment with many negative effects, such as MS worsening, cognitive dysfunction, worsening of dysarthria, and dysphagia. Immediate positive effects are seen in individuals treated with a thalamotomy procedure, but the tremor often comes back, so is not a complete treatment. Thalamotomy is in clinical trials to determine the validity of the treatment of intention tremors with all its high risks.

== Research directions ==
Research has focused on finding a pharmacological treatment that is specific for intention tremor. Limited success has been seen in treating it with drugs effective at treating essential tremor. Clinical trials of levetiracetam, typically used to treat epilepsy, and pramipexole, used to treat resting tremor, were completed in 2009–2010 to establish their effectiveness in treating kinetic tremor. A clinical trial for riluzole, typically used to treat amyotrophic lateral sclerosis, was completed at the Sapienza University of Rome to evaluate its effectiveness of treating cerebellar ataxia and kinetic tremor.

== History ==
In 1868, French neurologist Jean-Martin Charcot first characterized the distinction between MS, with its resulting intention tremor, and the resting tremor characteristic of Parkinson's disease. Intention tremor became known as part of Charcot's triad (not to be confused with the Charcot triad of acute cholangitis), which, along with nystagmus and scanning speech, act as strong indications of MS.
