= Oneirophrenia =

Psychotic disorder featuring hallucinations

Oneirophrenia (from the Greek words "ὄνειρος" (oneiros, "dream") and "φρήν" (phrēn, "mind")) is a hallucinatory, dream-like state caused by several conditions such as prolonged sleep deprivation, sensory deprivation, or drugs (such as the oneirogens ibogaine and harmaline). Oneirophrenia is often confused with an acute case of schizophrenia due to the onset of hallucinations. The severity of this condition can range from derealization to complete hallucinations and delusions. Oneirophrenia was described for the first time in the 1950s but was studied more in the 1960s.

== History ==
Oneirophrenia was studied in the 1950s by the neurologist and psychiatrist Ladislas J. Meduna (1896–1964), also known as the discoverer of one of the forms of shock therapy, using the drug metrazol. Although oneirophrenia was recognized as a specific condition in the 1950s, it was not studied in depth until the 1960s. During its beginning stages oneirophrenia was studied very closely with schizophrenia as an acute form due to the relationship between their symptoms. It wasn't until greater research that oneirophrenia became its own mental disease.

Meduna (1950) identified apperception disturbance as a core symptom of oneirophrenia, with primary impacts on sensory modalities: vision, proprioception and interoception (including body image), hearing, smell, and difficulty with central vision (e.g., foggy or hazy vision). Patients often experience a sense of unreality, which they struggle to accept for an extended period. Their reactions to the disorder are influenced by their pre-existing personality, typically beginning with fear and confusion. Oneirophrenia is characterized by "exogenous hallucinations," similar to those seen in delirium or states induced by psychoactive substances, as opposed to the "endogenous hallucinations" associated with schizophrenia. He proposed that "oneirophrenia, a primary illusionary psychosis, is the clinical result of a disturbance of the carbohydrate metabolism of the brain."

== Symptoms ==
Oneirophrenia is often described as a dream-like state that can lead to hallucinations and confusion. Feelings and emotions are often disturbed but information from the senses is left intact separating it from true schizophrenia.

== Causes ==
Oneirophrenia can result from long periods of sleep deprivation or extreme sensory deprivation. The hallucinations in oneirophrenia are increased or derive under decreased sensory input. Psychoanalysts, such as Claudio Naranjo, in the sixties have described the value of ibogaine-induced oneirophrenia for inducing and manipulating free fantasy and dream-like associations in patients under treatment.

== Diagnosis ==
=== Differential diagnosis ===
Oneirophrenia and schizophrenia are often confused although there are distinct differences between the conditions. Oneirophrenia has some of the characteristics of schizophrenia, such as a confusional state and clouding of consciousness, but without presenting the dissociative symptoms which are typical of that disorder. Oneiophrenia often begins with the inability to focus on things while schizophrenia frequently starts with a traumatic event. Persons affected by oneirophrenia have a feeling of dream-like derealization which, in its extreme form, may progress to delusions and hallucinations. Therefore, it is considered a schizophrenia-like acute form of psychosis which remits in about 60% of cases within a period of two years. It is estimated that 50% or more of schizophrenic patients present oneirophrenia at least once.

== Treatments ==
Oneirophrenic patients are resistant to insulin and when injected with glucose, these patients take 30 to 50% longer to return to normal glycemia. The meaning of this finding is not known, but it has been hypothesized that it may be due to an insulin antagonist present in the blood during psychosis. However, there is currently no known treatment for oneirophrenia.

== See also ==
- Oneirogen
