= Ladislas J. Meduna =

Psychiatrist and neuropathologist (1896-1964)

Ladislas Joseph Meduna
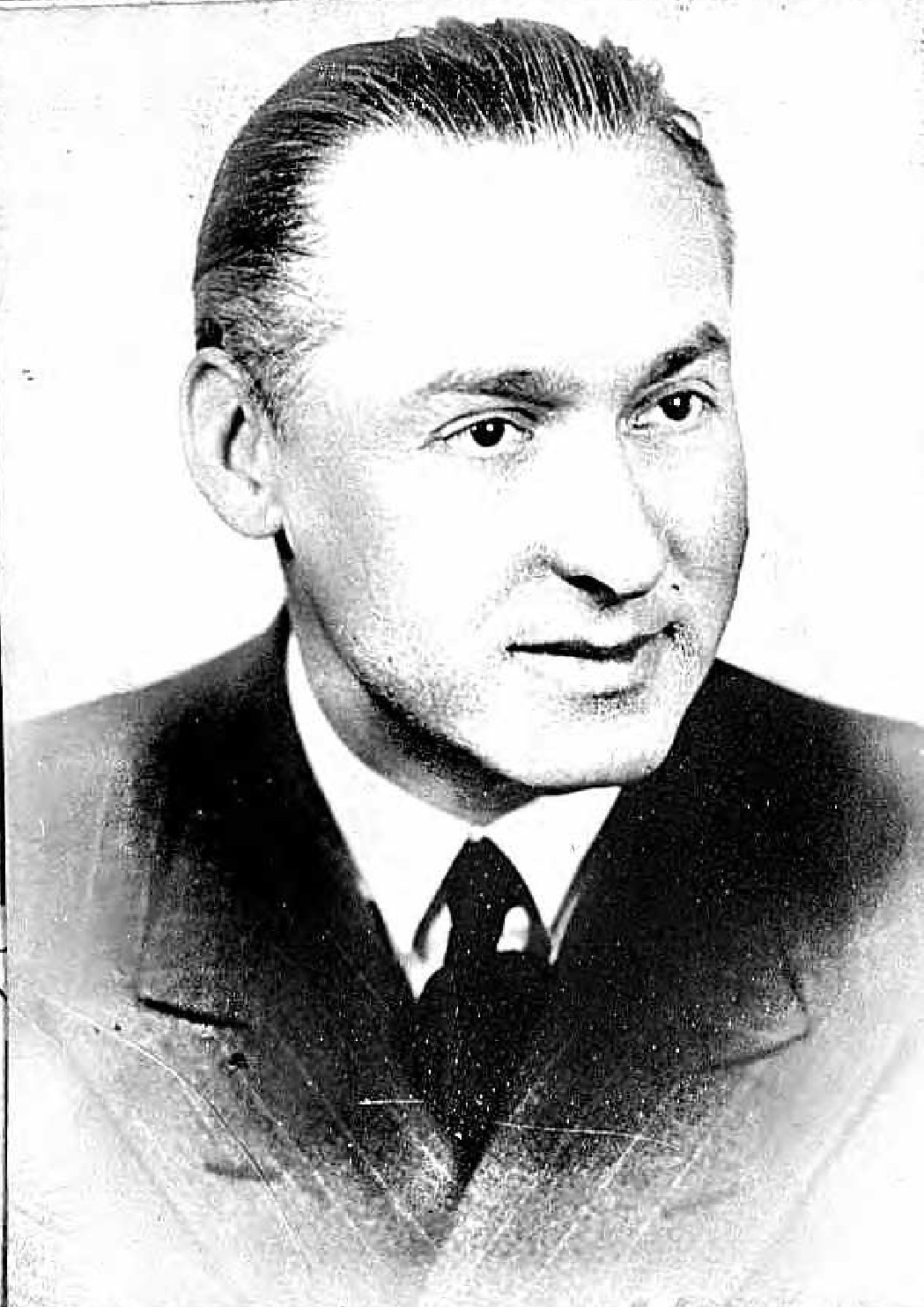
- Born: László Meduna; 27 March 1896
- Died: 31 October 1964 (aged 68)
- Known for: oneirophrenia, schizophrenia
- Scientific career
- Fields: psychiatry

Ladislas Joseph Meduna (27 March 1896 – 31 October 1964) was a Hungarian neuropathologist and neuropsychiatrist who initiated convulsive treatment, the repeated induction of grand mal seizures, as a treatment of psychosis. Observing the high concentration of glia in post-mortem brains of patients with epilepsy and a paucity in those with schizophrenia, he proposed that schizophrenia might be treated by inducing "epileptic" seizures. Thus, chemically induced seizures became the electroconvulsive therapy that is now in worldwide use.

With the rise of Nazism in Europe, he emigrated to Chicago in 1939. In studies with American scientists, Meduna explored carbon dioxide therapy for depression and anxiety and described oneirophrenia as a treatable psychiatric illness.

== Biography ==
=== Early life and family ===
Meduna was born to a well-to-do family in Budapest, Hungary, in 1896. His grandfather Giuseppe Carlo (József), a descendant of the Meduna family, came from Castelcucco, Italy, to Hungary, where he became a successful and awarded salami maker. Multiple members of the family branch, including Ladislas Meduna during his military service in World War I, oftentimes used the name Meduna di Montecucco or alternatively the noble title "von" in their name.

Meduna studied medicine in Budapest from 1914 to 1921, his studies being interrupted by military service in the Italian front from 1915 to 1918.

=== Early career ===
He was appointed to the Hungarian Interacademic Institute for Brain Research, also in Budapest, where he worked under the direction of Károly Schaffer. He studied the neuropathology of the structure and development of the pineal gland and of microglia, lead poisoning, and avitaminosis. In 1927 he moved to the Psychiatric Institute with Dr. Schaffer and began clinical and research work in psychopathology.

=== Induction of seizures ===
Meduna's interest in treating schizophrenia began with observations that the concentration of brain glia varied among patients who died with epilepsy (more glia than normal) and those with schizophrenia (less glia than normal). He thought that the inductions of seizures in patients with schizophrenia would increase the concentration of glia and relieve the illness. The concept was supported by reports that the incidence of epilepsy in hospitalized patients with schizophrenia was extremely low; and that a few schizophrenic patients who developed seizures after infection or head trauma, were relieved of their psychosis.

He sought ways to induce seizures in animals with chemicals. After trials with the alkaloids strychnine, thebaine, coramine, caffeine, and brucin, he settled on camphor dissolved in oil as effective and reliable. For a population with severe schizophrenia, he moved from Budapest to the psychiatric hospital at Lipotmező, outside Budapest. He began his dose-finding experiments on January 2, 1934. He was able to induce seizures in only about one-third of his subjects. Nevertheless, three of the first eleven patients had a positive response, encouraging his work (see Gazdag et al., 2009). In his autobiography, he recalls the case of a 33-year-old patient with severe catatonia who began his treatment on January 23, 1934. After just five sessions, catatonia and psychotic symptoms were abolished. Increasing his sample size to twenty-six patients, Meduna achieved recovery in ten and improvement in three more.

A major factor in Meduna's achievement was his selection of patients: nine of the first eleven were catatonic. Catatonia is a syndrome that is remarkably responsive to induced seizures. The serendipity that catatonia was considered schizophrenia at the time made his discovery possible.

Early on, Meduna replaced camphor with pentylenetetrazol (brand name Metrazol), an intravenous agent that typically induced seizures within a few minutes, compared with the long delay of 15 to 45 minutes after intramuscular administration of camphor. In addition to being a powerful analeptic drug, pentylenetetrazol is a potent cardiac and respiratory stimulant; consequently, patients experienced sensations most considered unpleasant. They were completely alert until unconsciousness from the convulsion set in, and unlike with electroconvulsive therapy, which caused retrograde amnesia that ameliorated any unpleasant memory of that treatment, patients remembered any sensations that preceded the Metrazol-induced convulsion. Meduna and some other physicians felt that the fear reaction may have been part of the reason the treatment was successful in some patients.

=== Published research ===
He first published his results in 1935 and then his major text in 1937. Die Konvulsionstherapie der Schizophrenie describes the results in 110 patients. Of these patients about half recovered. The results were much better for patients who were ill less than a year compared to those who had been ill for many years.

After his results were quickly reproduced in many other centers around the world, this form of therapy became widely used and recognized as the first effective treatment for schizophrenia.(A parallel development was insulin coma therapy.) A more facile form of induction of seizures, using electricity instead of chemicals, was developed by the Italian psychiatrists Ugo Cerletti and Lucio Bini. They treated their first patient with ECT in April 1938 and by the mid-1940s, electricity had replaced Metrazol as the induction agent.

=== Carbon dioxide therapy ===
Meduna also developed carbon dioxide therapy in which the patient breathed a gaseous mixture of 30% carbon dioxide and 70% oxygen called carboxygen or carbogen (and sometimes "Meduna's Mixture") that was designed to provoke a powerful feeling of suffocation, quickly triggering an unresponsive yet intense altered mental state. The treatment, while usually unpleasant or even terrifying, proved very useful for revealing previously unconscious fears. Challenging experiences on carbogen prepared patients for later psychedelic therapy in a profound way. It was not as effective as convulsive therapy in relieving the symptoms of obsessive-compulsive disorder and was therefore abandoned.

=== Migration to the United States ===
With the increase of antisemitism and the rise to power of Nazism, Meduna emigrated to the United States in the following year (1938), to become professor of neurology at Loyola University in Chicago. One of his last contributions to psychiatry was the study of confusional and dream-like states in psychoses (oneirophrenia) He was also a founder of the Journal of Neuropsychiatry and a President of the Society of Biological Psychiatry. After the war, he moved his research to the Illinois Psychiatric Institute, where he worked until his death in 1964.

== Sources ==
- Fink M. - Meduna and the Origins of Convulsive Therapy. Am. J. Psychiatry, 141(9): 1034–1041, 1984. correction, 141:1648
- Fink, M: ECT: Serendipity or Logical Outcome? Psychiatric Times January 2004 Vol. XXI Issue 1
- Mackay RP. Ladislas Joseph Meduna 1896–1964. Recent Adv Biol Psychiatry. 1965;8:357-8 [Medline citation]
- Fink, M: Historical Article: Autobiography of L.J. Meduna. Convuls Ther 1985; 1:43–57; 121–135 [Medline citation]
- Meduna LJ: Die Konvulsionstherapie der Schizophrenie. Halle, Germany, Carl Marhold, 1937
- Fink, M: Ladislas J. Meduna, M.D. 1896–1964. Am J Psychiatry 156:1807, November 1999
- The Papers of Ladislas J. Meduna (1896-1964). University of Illinois Archives Holdings.
- Gazdag G, Bitter I, Ungvari GS, Baran B, Fink M. László Meduna's pilot studies with camphor induction of seizures: The first 11 patients. J ECT 2009; 25:3-11.
- Shorter E. A History of Psychiatry. New York:John Wiley & Sons, 1997.
- Shorter E., Healy D. Shock Therapy: A History of Electroconvulsive Treatment in Mental illness. New Brunswick NJ: Rutgers University Press, 2007.
- Meduna L. Carbon Dioxide Therapy. Springfield IL: C.C Thomas, 1950.
- Meduna L: Oneirophrenia. Urbana IL: University of Illinois Press,100 pp., 1950

== Publications by Ladislas J. Meduna ==
- Meduna, L. J. The evolution of the pineal body in infants. Hung. Med. Arch. 6:1-8, 1924a.
- Meduna, L. J. Die entwicklung d. Zilberdruse in Sauglingsalter. Z. Anat. Ent. 76:534-547, 1924b.
- Meduna, L. J. Experimentelle B-Avitaminose des Kaninchens. Arch. Psychiatr. Nervenkr. 80:480–512, 1927a.
- Meduna, L. J. Beitrage zur Histopathologie der Mikroglia. Arch. Psychr. Nervenkr. 82:9-193, 1927b.
- Meduna, L. J. Untersuchungen über die experimentelle Bleivergiftung beim Meerschweinchen. Arch.Psychr. Nervenkr. 87:569-598, 1929.
- Meduna, L. J. Klinische und anatomische Beitrag zur Frage der genuinen Epilepsie. Deutsche Z. Nervenkr. 129:17-42, 1932 .
- Meduna, L. J. Uber experimentel!e Campherepilepsie. Arch. Psychr. Nervenkr. 102:333-339, 1934.
- Meduna, L. J. Versuche über die biologische Beeinflussung des Ablaufes der Schizophrenie. I. Campher und Cardiozolkriimpfe. Z. Neural. Psychr. 152:235-262, 1935a.
- Meduna, L. J. Die Konvulsionstherapie der Schizophrenie. Psychr. Neural. Wochenschr. 37:317-319, 1935b.
- Meduna, L. J. New methods of medical treatment of schizophrenia. Arch. Neural. Psychiatr. 35:361- 363, 1936.
- Meduna, L. J. Die Bedeutung des epileptischen Anfalls in der Insulin- und Cardiozolbehandlung der Schizophrenie. Psychr. Neural. Wochenschr. 39:331-334, 1937a.
- Meduna, L. J. Die Konvulsionstherapie der Schizophrenie. Carl Marhold, Halle, Germany, 121 pp., 1937b.
- Meduna, L. J. General discussion of cardiozol therapy. In: S. Katzenelbogen and F. Santee (Eds.): The Treatment of Schizophrenia. Insulin Shock, Cardiozol, Sleep Treatment. (Proc. Swiss Psychiatric Association, Muensingen, Berne, 1937.) Am . J Psychiatry 94 (Suppl.): 40--50, 1938a.
- Meduna, L. J. Significance of convulsive reaction during insulin and cardiozol therapy. J Nerv. Ment. Dis. 87:133-134, 19 38b.
- Meduna, L. J. Die Konvulsionstherapie der Schizophrenie. Rückblick und Ausblick. Psychr. Neural. Wochenschr. 4/:165-169, 1939.
- Meduna, L. J. Pharmaco-dynamic treatment of psychoneuroses. Dis. Nerv. Syst. 8:2-8, 1947.
- Meduna, L. J. Oneirophrenia. The Confusional State. University of Illinois Press, Urbana, 100 pp., 1950a.
- Meduna, L. J. Carbon Dioxide Therapy. C. C Thomas, Springfield, Ill., 236 pp., 1950b.
- Meduna, L. J., Braceland, F. J., Vaichules, J. Diagnostic difficulties and levulose tolerance test in "functional" mental diseases. Dis. Nerv. Syst . 4:101-114, 1943.
- Meduna, L. J. and Friedman, E. The convulsive-irritative therapy of the psychoses. JAMA 112:501- 509, 1939.
- Meduna, L. J., Gerty, F. J. and Urse, V G. Biochemical disturbances in mental disorders; anti-insulin effect of blood in cases of schizophrenia. Arch. Neurol. Psychiatr. 47:38-52, 1941.
- Meduna, L. J. and McCulloch, W S. Modern concept of schizophrenia. Med. Clin . North Am. 29:147- 164, 1945.
- Meduna, L. J. and Vaichules, J. A. Hyperglycemic factor in urine of so-called schizophrenics. Dis. Nerv. Syst . 9:208-250, 1948.
