= Waxy flexibility =

Catatonia psychomotor symptom

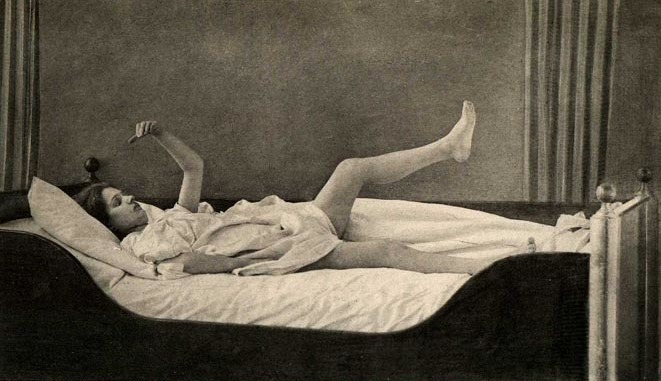
- Specialty: Psychiatry

Waxy flexibility is one of the twelve symptoms that can lead to the diagnosis of catatonia. It is a psychomotor symptom that results in a decreased response to stimuli and a tendency to remain in an immobile posture. If one were to move the arm of someone with waxy flexibility, the patient would keep that arm where it had been positioned until moved again as if positioning malleable wax. Attempts to reposition the patient are met by "slight, even resistance".

== Symptoms ==
Waxy flexibility is a specific symptom of catatonia. It refers to the patient's body showing resistance to being moved. Alteration of an individual's posture is similar to bending a warm candle.

Waxy flexibility often develops with other symptoms of catatonia, including:

- Immobility: showing no signs of motion
- Posturing: holding in an inappropriate body position for an extended period of time
- Mutism: lack or absence of speaking
- Ambitendency: a pattern of incomplete motor responses in anticipation of a voluntary action
- Withdrawal and refusal to eat
- Staring or no focus in eyes
- Negativism: persistent resistance to the suggestions of others or actions contrary to expectations or commands
- Automatic obedience: excessive, uncritical, or mechanical compliance with the requests, suggestions, or commands of others
- Stereotypy: persistent repetition of the same words, movements, or other behavior

== Causation ==
The exact cause of waxy flexibility, and catatonia, is unclear, but there are some reasonable possibilities. They are mainly believed to occur as a result of other underlying diseases.

Historically, waxy flexibility, and catatonia, have been linked to schizophrenia. A prospective and retrospective study that followed the DSM-3 criteria found that there was a 24.4% rate of catatonia to occur in schizophrenia patients. However, recent research showed that there is a significant decrease in diagnosed catatonic subtypes among schizophrenic disorders during the past decades. This is believed to be the result of sociocultural developments and the use of neuroleptics. In addition, the symptoms were better to fit outside of schizophrenia, which results in the possibility of a distinct clinical entity of catatonia or a variant of mood disorder.

Mood disorders such as bipolar disorder and depression are typical conditions in which catatonia manifests. Neurological injuries such as seizures, neoplasms, and other diseases like Parkinson's can also result in catatonia. Catatonia can also occur as a result of autoimmune, paraneoplastic, infectious, metabolic, and specific drug exposures and poisoning. Research suggests that genes do play a role, as the probability would be higher if close relatives have had this symptom.

According to research, the underlying mechanisms are linked to abnormalities in certain neurotransmitters, especially GABAergic (gamma-aminobutyric acid) neurotransmitters. These are the neurotransmitters that govern both emotional and cognitive functioning. Catatonic symptoms are possible outcomes of a disruption in the GABAergic neurotransmitter system. It is theorized that catatonia patients' brains exhibit decreased GABA action.

== Diagnosis ==
Waxy flexibility can be usually confirmed through observation. It generally does not require lab testing or imaging, but certain testing such as EEGs, MRIs, or CTs can help to confirm the underlying cause. Waxy flexibility alongside two or more other symptoms such as stupor or negativism is enough to warrant a diagnosis of catatonia.

== Treatment ==
The treatment for waxy flexibility requires treating the underlying disease, catatonia.

The most common treatment for catatonia is benzodiazepines. Benzodiazepines are drugs that act on the GABA receptors and are believed to be the most effective medication for treating catatonia. They have properties that result in the reduction of anxiety, are relaxant in muscles, reduce excitement, and sleep inducing. A frequently used benzodiazepine is lorazepam. A previous study has shown that 2 in 3 of the participants in a 107 people sample responded sufficiently to lorazepam.

Another common treatment is electroconvulsive therapy (ECT). ECT is mainly used when the patient's symptoms fail to respond to benzodiazepines for a week, and the underlying cause of catatonia either is unable to be treated or does not improve the symptoms after treatment. ECT is effective in the resolution of both primary and secondary signs of catatonia. It is also found that catatonic patients with waxy flexibility responded faster to ECT compared to patients with other symptoms of catatonia. Despite that ECT is proven safe and effective by well-established data, there is still a stigma associated with it. Legal restrictions for its use in catatonia are also critical obstacles.

== Prevention ==
The majority of people who are diagnosed with catatonia go through some form of psychiatric crisis. Therefore, lowering one's stress levels should be the initial action in the process of preventing catatonia and waxy flexibility from occurring. Because waxy flexibility is a psychomotor symptom, attention should be spread across both the psycho and the motor aspects of the condition, rather than focusing more on one aspect while neglecting the other. It is advised to stay in a bright, clean environment while having access to mental support.

== Others ==
=== Waxy flexibility vs. catalepsy ===
Waxy flexibility and catalepsy are both posturing symptoms of catatonia. Both are symptoms describing the patient posturing in a stiff and rigid state. However, there are still some fundamental differences. On one hand, waxy flexibility refers to the state in which a patient's limbs and joints remain in a certain position, but it emphasizes the slow release of the stiffness as if their limbs are made of wax. On the other hand, catalepsy focuses on fixed postures for prolonged periods of time with minimal movement regardless of external stimuli. This means that even if a posture were uncomfortable, the patient would stay in that position, not moving even if they experienced external pain.
