= Dysarthria =

Poor speech due to neurological injury

- Other names: Speech sound disorder, Developmental speech sound disorder
- Specialty: Neurology, neuropsychology, speech–language pathology
- Symptoms: Slurred speech, weak execution of oral muscular movements

Dysarthria is a speech sound disorder resulting from neurological injury of the motor component of the motor–speech system and is characterized by poor articulation of phonemes. Those affected lack sufficient control of the muscles used for speech to pronounce words clearly. Dysarthria is unrelated to problems with understanding language (that is, dysphasia or aphasia), although a person can have both. Any of the speech subsystems (respiration, phonation, resonance, prosody, and articulation) can be affected, leading to impairments in intelligibility, audibility, naturalness, and efficiency of vocal communication. Dysarthria that has progressed to a total loss of speech is referred to as anarthria. The term dysarthria was formed from the Greek components dys- "dysfunctional, impaired" and arthr- "joint, vocal articulation".

Neurological injury due to damage in the central or peripheral nervous system may result in weakness, paralysis, or a lack of coordination of the motor–speech system, producing dysarthria. These effects in turn hinder control over the tongue, throat, lips or lungs; for example, swallowing problems (dysphagia) are also often present in those with dysarthria. Cranial nerves that control the muscles relevant to dysarthria include the trigeminal nerve's motor branch (V), the facial nerve (VII), the glossopharyngeal nerve (IX), the vagus nerve (X), and the hypoglossal nerve (XII).

Dysarthria does not include speech disorders from structural abnormalities, such as cleft palate and must not be confused with apraxia of speech, which refers to problems in the planning and programming aspect of the motor–speech system. Just as the term "articulation" can mean either "speech" or "joint movement", so is the combining form of arthr- the same in the terms "dysarthria", "dysarthrosis", and "arthropathy"; the term "dysarthria" is conventionally reserved for the speech problem and is not used to refer to arthropathy, whereas "dysarthrosis" has both senses but usually refers to arthropathy.

== Causes ==
Various neurological and motor disorders can give rise to dysarthria. The main causes can be classified as genetic, infectious, toxic, traumatic, vascular, neoplastic, demyelinating, degenerative, or other.

- Genetic: Wilson's disease, Tay–Sachs disease, and Sensory ataxic neuropathy, dysarthria, and ophthalmoparesis (SANDO syndrome)
- Infectious: Lyme disease (borreliosis) and Creutzfeldt–Jakob disease (CJD)
- Toxic: Heavy metal poisoning and Alcohol
- Traumatic: Cerebral palsy (CP), Traumatic brain injury (TBI), Chronic traumatic encephalopathy (CTE)
- Vascular: Stroke and Transient ischemic attack (TIA)
- Neoplastic: Brain tumors
- Demyelinating: Multiple sclerosis (MS) and Guillain–Barré syndrome (GBS)
- Degenerative: Parkinson's disease (PD), Huntington's disease (HD), Amyotrophic lateral sclerosis (ALS), Niemann-Pick disease (NP disease), and Friedreich's ataxia (FRDA or FA)
- Other: Hypothermia, Hypoxic encephalopathy, Central pontine myelinolysis, and Idiopathic intracranial hypertension (IIH), Autism Spectrum Disorder (ASD)

These result in lesions to key areas of the brain involved in planning, executing, or regulating motor operations in skeletal muscles (i.e. muscles of the limbs), including muscles of the head and neck (dysfunction of which characterises dysarthria). These can result in dysfunction, or failure of: the motor or somatosensory cortex of the brain, corticobulbar pathways, the cerebellum, basal nuclei (consisting of the putamen, globus pallidus, caudate nucleus, substantia nigra etc.), brainstem (from which the cranial nerves originate), or the neuromuscular junction (in diseases such as myasthenia gravis) which block the nervous system's ability to activate motor units and effect correct range and strength of movements.

== Diagnosis ==
=== Classification ===
Dysarthrias are classified in multiple ways based on the presentation of symptoms. Specific dysarthrias include spastic (resulting from bilateral damage to the upper motor neuron), flaccid (resulting from bilateral or unilateral damage to the lower motor neuron), ataxic (resulting from damage to cerebellum), unilateral upper motor neuron (presenting milder symptoms than bilateral UMN damage), hyperkinetic and hypokinetic (resulting from damage to parts of the basal ganglia, such as in Huntington's disease or Parkinsonism), and the mixed dysarthrias (where symptoms of more than one type of dysarthria are present). The majority of people with dysarthria are diagnosed as having 'mixed' dysarthria, as neural damage resulting in dysarthria is rarely contained to one part of the nervous system—for example, multiple strokes, traumatic brain injury, and some kinds of degenerative illnesses (such as amyotrophic lateral sclerosis) usually damage many different sectors of the nervous system.

Ataxic dysarthria is an acquired neurological and sensorimotor speech deficit. It is a common diagnosis among the clinical spectrum of ataxic disorders. Since regulation of skilled movements is a primary function of the cerebellum, damage to the superior cerebellum and the superior cerebellar peduncle is believed to produce this form of dysarthria in ataxic patients. Growing evidence supports the likelihood of cerebellar involvement specifically affecting speech motor programming and execution pathways, producing the characteristic features associated with ataxic dysarthria. This link to speech motor control can explain the abnormalities in articulation and prosody, which are hallmarks of this disorder. Some of the most consistent abnormalities observed in patients with ataxia dysarthria are alterations of the normal timing pattern, with prolongation of certain segments and a tendency to equalize the duration of syllables when speaking. As the severity of the dysarthria increases, the patient may also lengthen more segments as well as increase the degree of lengthening of each individual segment.

Common clinical features of ataxic dysarthria include abnormalities in speech modulation, rate of speech, explosive or scanning speech, slurred speech, irregular stress patterns, and vocalic and consonantal misarticulations.

Ataxic dysarthria is associated with damage to the left cerebellar hemisphere in right-handed patients.

Dysarthria may affect a single system; however, it is more commonly reflected in multiple motor–speech systems. The etiology, degree of neuropathy, existence of co-morbidities, and the individual's response all play a role in the effect the disorder has on the individual's quality of life. Severity ranges from occasional articulation difficulties to verbal speech that is completely unintelligible.

Individuals with dysarthria may experience challenges in the following:

- Timing
- Vocal quality
- Pitch
- Volume
- Breath control
- Speed
- Strength
- Steadiness
- Range
- Tone

Examples of specific observations include a continuous breathy voice, irregular breakdown of articulation, monopitch, distorted vowels, word flow without pauses, and hypernasality.

== Treatment ==
Articulation problems resulting from dysarthria are treated by speech language pathologists, using a variety of techniques. Techniques used depend on the effect the dysarthria has on control of the articulators. Traditional treatments target the correction of deficits in rate (of articulation), prosody (appropriate emphasis and inflection, affected e.g. by apraxia of speech, right hemisphere brain damage, etc.), intensity (loudness of the voice, affected e.g. in hypokinetic dysarthrias such as in Parkinson's), resonance (ability to alter the vocal tract and resonating spaces for correct speech sounds) and phonation (control of the vocal folds for appropriate voice quality and valving of the airway). These treatments have usually involved exercises to increase strength and control over articulator muscles (which may be flaccid and weak, or overly tight and difficult to move), and using alternate speaking techniques to increase speaker intelligibility (how well someone's speech is understood by peers). With the speech–language pathologist, there are several skills that are important to learn; safe chewing and swallowing techniques, avoiding conversations when feeling tired, repeat words and syllables over and over in order to learn the proper mouth movements, and techniques to deal with the frustration while speaking. Depending on the severity of the dysarthria, another possibility includes learning how to use a computer or flip cards in order to communicate more effectively.

More recent techniques based on the principles of motor learning (PML), such as LSVT (Lee Silverman voice treatment) speech therapy and specifically LSVT may improve voice and speech function in PD. For Parkinson's, aim to retrain speech skills through building new generalised motor programs, and attach great importance to regular practice, through peer/partner support and self-management. Regularity of practice, and when to practice, are the main issues in PML treatments, as they may determine the likelihood of generalization of new motor skills, and therefore how effective a treatment is.

Augmentative and alternative communication (AAC) devices that make coping with a dysarthria easier include speech synthesis and text-based telephones. These allow people who are unintelligible, or may be in the later stages of a progressive illness, to continue to be able to communicate without the need for fully intelligible speech.

== See also ==
- Lists of language disorders
