= Echopraxia =

Involuntary imitation of another person's actions

Echopraxia (also known as echokinesis) is the involuntary repetition or imitation of another person's actions. Similar to echolalia, the involuntary repetition of sounds and language, it is one of the echophenomena ("automatic imitative actions without explicit awareness"). It has long been recognized as a core feature of Tourette syndrome, and is considered a complex tic, but it also occurs in autism spectrum disorders, schizophrenia and catatonia, aphasia, and disorders involving the startle reflex such as latah. Echopraxia has also been observed in individuals with epilepsy, dementia and autoimmune disorders; the causes of and the link between echopraxia and these disorders is undetermined.

The etymology of the term is from Ancient Greek: "ἠχώ (ēkhō) from ἠχή (ēkhē "sound") and "πρᾶξις (praksis, "action, activity, practice)".

== Characteristics ==
Echopraxia is the involuntary mirroring of an observed action. Imitated actions can range from simple motor tasks such as picking up a phone to violent actions such as hitting another person.

Imitative learning and emulation of physical and verbal actions are critical to early development (up to the age of two or three), but when these behaviors become reactions rather than a means for learning, they are considered echophenomena (copying behaviors).

== Causes ==
Echopraxia is a typical symptom of Tourette syndrome but causes are not well elucidated.

Frontal lobe animation

One theoretical cause subject to ongoing debate surrounds the role of the mirror neuron system (MNS), a group of neurons in the inferior frontal gyrus (F5 region) of the brain that may influence imitative behaviors, but no widely accepted neural or computational models have been put forward to describe how mirror neuron activity supports cognitive functions such as imitation.

== Diagnosis ==
There is no formal test for diagnosing echopraxia. It is easier to distinguish in individuals over the age of five, because younger children frequently imitate others' actions.

Imitation can be divided into two types: imitative learning and automatic imitation. Imitative learning occurs when a person consciously mimics an observed action in order to learn the mechanism behind that action and perform it themselves. Babies begin copying movements soon after birth; this behavior begins to diminish around the age of three. Before that, it is not possible to diagnose echopraxia, because it is difficult to differentiate between imitative learning and automatic imitation. If the imitative behavior continues beyond infanthood, it may be considered echopraxia.

Echopraxia may be more easily distinguished in older individuals, because their behaviors in relation to prior behaviors can be differentiated. They report feeling an uncontrollable urge to perform an action after seeing it being performed. Automatic behavior is occasionally present in healthy adults (for example, when a person observes someone yawning, he or she may do the same); these behaviors are not considered echopraxia.
