= Echolalia =

Speech disorder

- Other names: Echologia, echophrasia
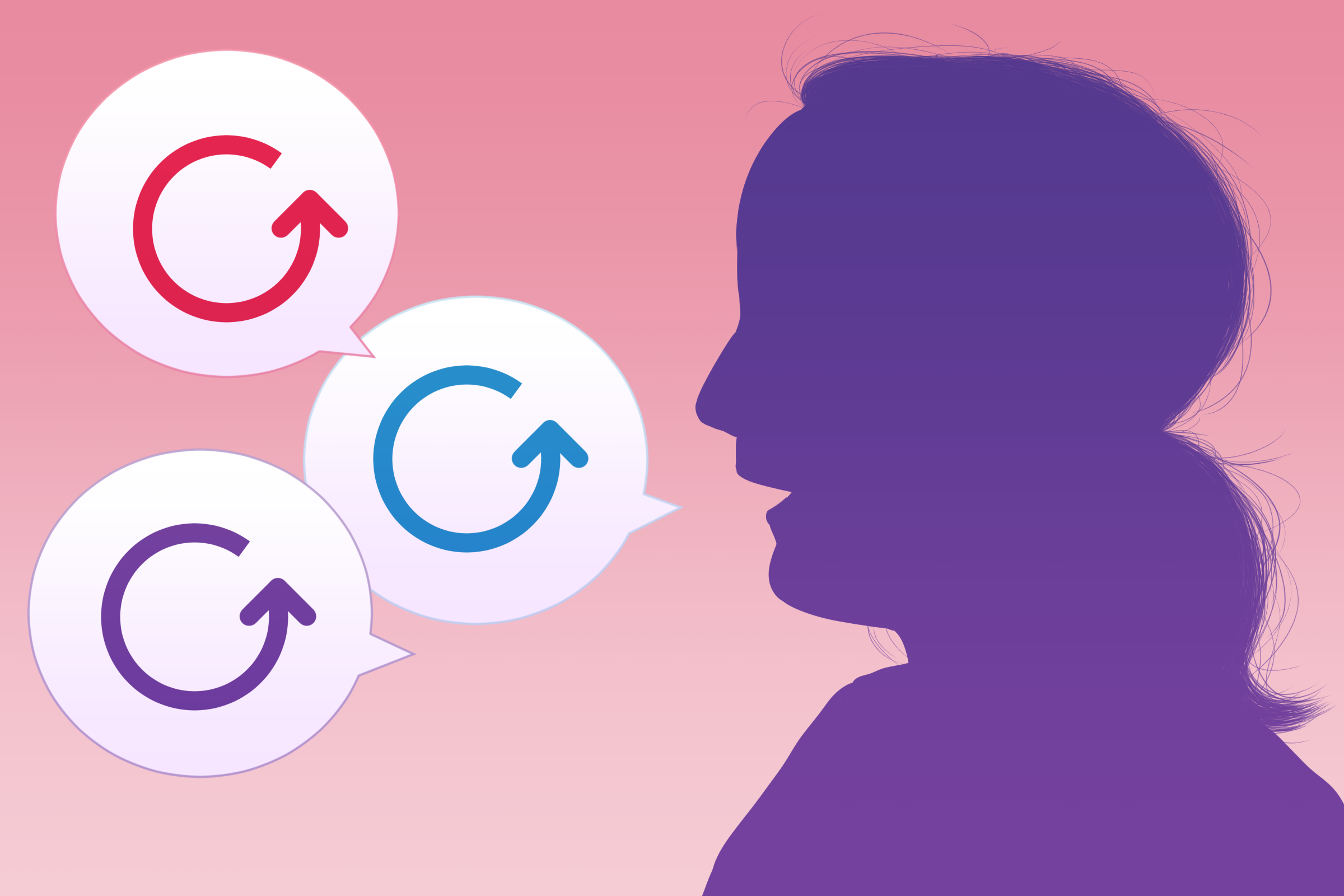
- Specialty: Psychiatry, neurology, speech–language pathology

Echolalia is the repetition of vocalizations made by another person; when repeated by the same person, it is called palilalia. In its profound form it is automatic and effortless. It is one of the echophenomena, closely related to echopraxia, the automatic repetition of movements made by another person; both are "subsets of imitative behavior" whereby sounds or actions are imitated "without explicit awareness". Echolalia may be an immediate reaction to a stimulus or may be delayed.

Echolalia occurs in many cases of autism spectrum disorder, ADHD, and Tourette syndrome. It may also occur in several other neurological conditions such as some forms of dementia or stroke-related aphasia.

The word "echolalia" is derived from the Greek ἠχώ (ēchō), meaning "echo" or "to repeat", and λαλιά (laliá) meaning "speech" or "talk" (of onomatopoeic origin, from the verb λαλέω (laléo), meaning "to talk").

== Signs and symptoms ==
Echolalia can be categorized as either immediate (occurring immediately after the stimulus) or delayed (some time after the occurrence of a stimulus). Immediate echolalia results from quick recall of information from the short-term memory and "superficial linguistic processing". A typical pediatric presentation of immediate echolalia might be as follows: a child is asked "Do you want dinner?"; the child echoes back "Do you want dinner?", followed by a pause, and then a response, "Yes. What's for dinner?" In delayed echolalia the patient repeats words, phrases, or multiple sentences after a delay that can be anywhere from hours to years later. Immediate echolalia can be indicative that a developmental disorder exists, but this is not necessarily the case.

Mitigated echolalia refers to a repetition in which the original stimulus is somewhat altered, and ambient echolalia refers to the repetition (typically occurring in individuals with dementia) of environmental stimuli such as a television program running in the background.

Examples of mitigated echolalia are pronoun changes or syntax corrections. The first can be seen in the example of asking the patient "Where are you going?" and with patient responding "Where am I going?" The latter would be seen in the clinician asking "Where are I going?" and the patient repeating "Where am I going?" In mitigated echolalia some language processing is occurring. Mitigated echolalia can be seen in dyspraxia and aphasia of speech.

== Associated disorders ==
Echolalia can be an indicator of communication disorders in autism, but is neither unique to, nor synonymous with syndromes. Echophenomena (particularly echolalia and echopraxia) were defining characteristics in the early descriptions of Tourette syndrome (TS). Echolalia also occurs in aphasia, schizophrenia, dementia, catatonia, epilepsy, after cerebral infarction (stroke), closed-head injury, in blind children, children with language impairments, as well as certain developing, neurotypical children. Other disorders associated with echolalia are Pick's disease, frontotemporal dementia, corticobasal degeneration, as well as progressive supranuclear palsy.

In transcortical sensory aphasia, echolalia is common, with the patient incorporating another person's words or sentences into their own response. While these patients lack speech comprehension, they are still able to read.

== Anatomical correlates ==
Echolalia can be the result of left hemisphere damage. Specifically, damage to the frontal lobe of the left hemisphere has been linked to effortful echolalia. Cases of echolalia have appeared after lesions of the left medial frontal lobe and supplemental motor areas. Unintentional or nonfunctional echolalia shows similarities to imitation behavior seen after disinhibition of the frontal network and is most likely related to mirror neurons. In cases where echolalia is a part of mixed transitory aphasia, the perisylvian language area remains intact, but the surrounding anterior and posterior association cortexes degenerate or experience infraction.

== Imitation and learning ==
Echolalia is common in young children who are first learning to speak. Echolalia is a form of imitation. Imitation is a useful, normal and necessary component of social learning: imitative learning occurs when the "observer acquires new behaviors through imitation" and mimicry or automatic imitation occurs when a "reenacted behavior is based on previously acquired motor (or vocal) patterns". Ganos et al (2012) define echolalia as an "automatic imitative action without explicit awareness". Children often first babble syllables and eventually words they hear. For example, a baby may often hear the word "bottle" in various sentences. The baby first repeats with only syllables such as "baba" but as their language skills progress the child will eventually be able to say the word "bottle". Echolalia becomes less and less common as a child's language skills develop. It is not possible to distinguish the imitative learning form of echolalia that occurs as part of normal development from automatic imitation or echolalia characteristic of a disorder until about the age of three, when some ability for self-regulation is developed. A disorder may be suspected if automatic imitation persists beyond the age of three.

== Function ==
Before the 1980s, echolalia was regarded as negative, non-functional behavior. However, researchers such as Barry Prizant and colleagues have emphasized the communicative function of echolalia. Among the communicative functions noted are turntaking, requesting, self-regulation and rehearsal to aid comprehension. Echolalia can be categorized as communicative (in context and with "apparent communicative purpose") vs. semicommunicative (an "unclear communicative meaning").

The use of echolalia in task response to facilitate generalization is an area that holds much promise. Research in this area is certainly needed. Marjorie H. Charlop performed a series of task experiments with autistic children. The results suggest that perhaps in certain tasks (i.e., receptive labeling), echolalia should not be eliminated, but taken advantage of as it may facilitate acquisition and generalization for autistic children.

=== Tourette syndrome ===
Echolalia and echopraxia are distinguishing tics of Tourette syndrome (TS); the echolalic repetitions of individuals with TS are mainly echoes from within their own "tic repertoire". Evidence points to a healthy mirror neuron system (MNS), but "inadequate imitation-control mechanism, which make them vulnerable to interferences".

=== Autism ===
A symptom of some autistic children is the struggle to produce spontaneous speech. Studies have shown that in some cases echolalia is used as a coping mechanism allowing an autistic person to contribute to a conversation when unable to produce spontaneous speech. Studies in the 1980s showed that there may be communicative intent with delayed echolalia, "depending on the context in which it occurs"; this research on autistic children "raised questions related to behavior modification programs that defended the revocation or replacement of immediate echolalia".

Uta Frith, Prizant and others have interpreted echolalia as evidence of "gestalt" processing in autistic children, including in the acquisition of language. However, a 1990 study on the acquisition of grammar by Tager-Flusberg and Calkins found that echolalia did not facilitate grammatical development in autistic children.

== See also ==
- List of language disorders
