= Scale for the Assessment of Positive Symptoms =

Scale assessing symptoms of schizophrenia

Within psychological testing, the Scale for the Assessment of Positive Symptoms (SAPS) is a rating scale to measure positive symptoms in schizophrenia. The scale was developed by Nancy Andreasen and was first published in 1984. SAPS is split into 4 domains, and within each domain separate symptoms are rated from 0 (absent) to 5 (severe). The scale is closely linked to the Scale for the Assessment of Negative Symptoms (SANS) which was published a few years earlier.

== Items ==
=== Hallucinations ===
- Auditory Hallucinations
- Voices Commenting
- Voices Conversing
- Somatic or Tactile Hallucinations
- Olfactory Hallucinations
- Visual Hallucinations
- Global Rating of Severity of Hallucinations

=== Delusions ===
- Persecutory Delusions
- Delusions of Jealousy
- Delusions of Sin or Guilt
- Grandiose Delusions
- Religious Delusions
- Somatic Delusions
- Ideas and Delusions of Reference
- Delusions of Being Controlled
- Delusions of Mind Reading
- Thought Broadcasting
- Thought Insertion
- Thought Withdrawal
- Global Rating of Severity of Delusions

=== Bizarre Behaviour ===
- Clothing and Appearance
- Social and Sexual Behavior
- Aggressive and Agitated Behavior
- Repetitive or Stereotyped Behavior
- Global Rating of Severity of Bizarre Behavior

=== Positive Formal Thought Disorder ===
- Derailment (loose associations)
- Tangentiality
- Incoherence (Word salad, Schizophasia)
- Illogicality
- Circumstantiality
- Pressure of speech
- Distractible speech
- Clanging
- Global Rating of Positive Formal Thought Disorder

== See also ==
- Brief Psychiatric Rating Scale (BPRS)
- Diagnostic classification and rating scales used in psychiatry
- Positive and Negative Syndrome Scale (PANSS)
- Scale for the Assessment of Negative Symptoms (SANS)
