= Thought disorder =

Disorder of thought form, content or stream

- Other names: Formal thought disorder (FTD), thinking disorder
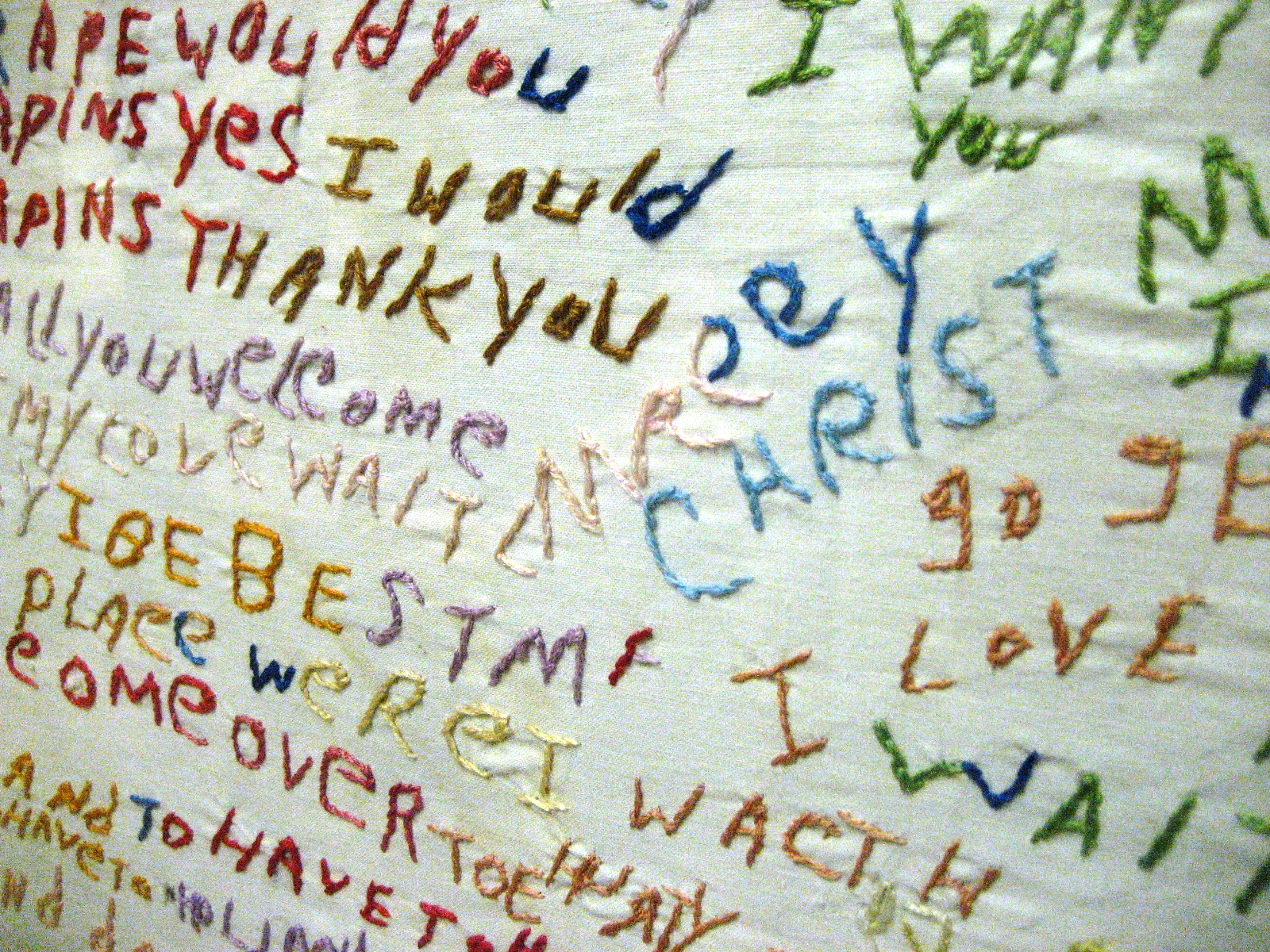
- Cloth embroidered by a person diagnosed with schizophrenia, showing non-linear text arranged in a disconnected, fragmented fashion.
- Specialty: Psychiatry, clinical psychology

A thought disorder (TD) is a multifaceted construct that reflects abnormalities in thinking, language, and communication. Thought disorders encompass a range of thought and language difficulties and include poverty of ideas, perverted logic (illogical or delusional thoughts), word salad, delusions, derailment, pressured speech, poverty of speech, tangentiality, verbigeration, and thought blocking. One of the first known public presentations of a thought disorder, specifically obsessive–compulsive disorder (OCD) as it is now known, was in 1691, when Bishop John Moore gave a speech before Queen Mary II, about "religious melancholy".

Two subcategories of thought disorder are content-thought disorder, and formal thought disorder. CTD has been defined as a thought disturbance characterized by multiple fragmented delusions. A formal thought disorder is a disruption of the form (or structure) of thought. Also known as disorganized thinking, FTD affects the form (rather than the content) of thought. FTD results in disorganized speech and is recognized as a key feature of schizophrenia and other psychotic disorders (including mood disorders, dementia, mania, and neurological diseases). Unlike hallucinations and delusions, it is an observable, objective sign of psychosis. FTD is a common core symptom of a psychotic disorder, and may be seen as a marker of severity and as an indicator of prognosis. It reflects a cluster of cognitive, linguistic, and affective disturbances that have generated research interest in the fields of cognitive neuroscience, neurolinguistics, and psychiatry.

Eugen Bleuler, who named schizophrenia, said that TD was its defining characteristic. Disturbances of thinking and speech, such as clanging or echolalia, may also be present in Tourette syndrome; other symptoms may be found in delirium. A clinical difference exists between these two groups. Patients with psychoses are less likely to show awareness or concern about disordered thinking, and those with other disorders are aware and concerned about not being able to think clearly.

== Content-thought disorder ==
Thought content is the subject of a person's thoughts, or the types of ideas expressed. Mental health professionals define normal thought content as the absence of significant abnormalities, distortions, or harmful thoughts. Normal thought content aligns with reality, is appropriate to the situation, and does not cause significant distress or impair functioning.

A person's cultural background must be considered when assessing thought content. Abnormalities in thought content differ across cultures. Specific types of abnormal thought content can be features of different psychiatric illnesses.

Examples of disordered thought content include:

- Suicidal ideation: thoughts of ending one's own life.
- Homicidal ideation: thoughts of ending the life of another.
- Delusion: A fixed, false belief that a person holds despite contrary undeniable & unfalsifiable evidence and that is not a shared cultural belief.
- Paranoid ideation: thoughts, not severe enough to be considered delusions, involving excessive suspicion or the belief that one is being harassed, persecuted, or unfairly treated.
- Preoccupation: excessive and/or distressing thoughts that are stressor-related and associated with negative emotions.
- Obsessive–compulsive disorder: As obsession, repeated intrusive thoughts that are inappropriate, and distressing or upsetting, and compulsive behavior repeated actions as an attempt to rid the intrusive thoughts.
- Magical thinking: A false belief in a causal link between actions and events. The mistaken belief that one's thoughts, words, or actions can cause or prevent an outcome in a way that violates the laws of cause and effect.
- Overvalued ideas: false or exaggerated belief held with conviction, but without delusional intensity.
- Phobias: irrational fears of objects or circumstances that are persistent.
- Poverty of ideas: abnormally few thoughts and ideas expressed.
- Overabundance of thought: abnormally many thoughts and ideas expressed.

== Formal thought disorder ==
Thought process is the form, flow, and coherence of thinking. This is how language is used and ideas put together. A normal thought process is logical, linear, meaningful, and goal-directed that demonstrates rational, sequential connections between thoughts that allows others to understand. Thought process is not what a person thinks, rather it is how a person expresses their thoughts.

Formal thought disorder (FTD), also known as disorganized speech or disorganized thinking, is a disorder of a person's thought process in which they are unable to express their thoughts in a logical and linear fashion. Mild forms of disorganised speech are quite common, and to be considered as a diagnostic criterion for psychosis it must be severe enough to prevent effective communication. Disorganized speech is a core symptom of psychosis, and therefore can be a feature of any condition that has a potential to cause psychosis, including schizophrenia, mania, major depressive disorder, delirium, postpartum psychosis, major neurocognitive disorder, and substance induced psychosis. FTD reflects a cluster of cognitive, linguistic, and affective disturbances, and has generated research interest from the fields of cognitive neuroscience, neurolinguistics, and psychiatry.

It can be subdivided into clusters of positive and negative symptoms and objective (rather than subjective) symptoms. On the scale of positive and negative symptoms, they have been grouped into positive formal thought disorder (posFTD) and negative formal thought disorder (negFTD). Positive subtypes were pressure of speech, tangentiality, derailment, incoherence, and illogicality; negative subtypes were poverty of speech and poverty of content. The two groups were posited to be at either end of a spectrum of normal speech, but later studies showed them to be poorly correlated. A comprehensive measure of FTD is the Thought and Language Disorder (TALD) Scale. The Kiddie Formal Thought Disorder Rating Scale (K-FTDS) can be used to assess the presence of formal thought disorder in children and their childhood. Although it is very extensive and time-consuming, its results are in great detail and reliable.

Nancy Andreasen preferred to identify TDs as thought-language-communication disorders (TLC disorders). Up to seven domains of FTD have been described on the Thought, Language, Communication (TLC) Scale, with most of the variance accounted for by two or three domains. Some TLC disorders are more suggestive of severe disorder, and are listed with the first 11 items.

=== Diagnoses ===
In the diagnosis of a psychotic disorder, the DSM-5 (as did DSM-4) uses the term disorganized thinking (speech) over formal thought disorder, used as a synonym. It was thought that formal thought disorder was too difficult to firmly define, and that inferences about a person's thinking can be gained from their speech. Clinical psychologists typically assess FTD by initiating an exploratory conversation with a client and observing their verbal responses.

FTD is often used to establish a diagnosis of schizophrenia; in cross-sectional studies, 27 to 80 percent of patients with schizophrenia present with FTD. A hallmark feature of schizophrenia, it is also widespread amongst other psychiatric disorders; up to 60 percent of those with schizoaffective disorder and 53 percent of those with clinical depression demonstrate FTD, suggesting that it is not exclusive to schizophrenia. About six percent of healthy subjects exhibit a mild form of FTD. Less severe FTD may happen during the initial (prodromal) stage, and after psychosis has diminished.

The characteristics of FTD vary amongst disorders. A number of studies indicate that FTD in mania is marked by irrelevant intrusions and pronounced combinatory thinking, usually with a playfulness and flippancy absent from patients with schizophrenia. The FTD present in patients with schizophrenia was characterized by disorganization, neologism, and fluid thinking, and confusion with word-finding difficulty.

There is limited data on the longitudinal course of FTD. The most comprehensive longitudinal study of FTD by 2023 found a distinction in the longitudinal course of thought-disorder symptoms between schizophrenia and other psychotic disorders. The study also found an association between social, work and educational functioning before first hospitalization and the longitudinal course of FTD.

=== Possible causes ===
Several theories have been developed to explain the causes of formal thought disorder. It has been proposed that FTD relates to neurocognition via semantic memory. Semantic network impairment in people with schizophrenia—measured by the difference between fluency (e.g. the number of animals' names produced in 60 seconds) and phonological fluency (e.g. the number of words beginning with "F" produced in 60 seconds)—predicts the severity of formal thought disorder, suggesting that verbal information (through semantic priming) is unavailable. Other hypotheses include working memory deficit (being confused about what has already been said in a conversation) and attentional focus.

FTD in schizophrenia has been found to be associated with structural and functional abnormalities in the language network, where structural studies have found bilateral grey matter deficits; deficits in the bilateral inferior frontal gyrus, bilateral inferior parietal lobule and bilateral superior temporal gyrus are FTD correlates. Other studies did not find an association between FTD and structural aberrations of the language network, however, and regions not included in the language network have been associated with FTD. Future research is needed to clarify whether there is an association with FTD in schizophrenia and neural abnormalities in the language network.

Neurotransmitter dysfunctions that might cause FTD have also been investigated. Studies have found that glutamate dysfunction, due to a rarefaction of glutamatergic synapses in the superior temporal gyrus in patients with schizophrenia, is a major cause of positive FTD.

The heritability of FTD has been demonstrated in a number of family and twin studies. Imaging genetics studies, using a semantic verbal-fluency task performed by the participants during functional MRI scanning, revealed that alleles linked to glutamatergic transmission contribute to functional aberrations in typical language-related brain areas. FTD is not solely genetically determined, however; environmental influences, such as allusive thinking in parents during childhood, and environmental risk factors for schizophrenia (including childhood abuse, migration, social isolation, and cannabis use) also contribute to the pathophysiology of FTD.

The origins of FTD have been theorised from a social-learning perspective. Singer and Wynne said that familial communication patterns play a key role in shaping the development of FTD; dysfunctional social interactions undermine a child's development of cohesive, stable mental representations of the world, increasing their risk of developing FTD.

=== Treatments ===
Antipsychotic medication is often used to treat FTD. Although the vast majority of studies of the efficacy of antipsychotic treatment do not report effects on syndromes or symptoms, six older studies report the effects of antipsychotic treatment on FTD. These studies and clinical experience indicate that antipsychotics are often an effective treatment for patients with positive or negative FTD, but not all patients respond to them.

Cognitive behavioral therapy (CBT) is another treatment for FTD, but its effectiveness has not been well-studied. Large randomised controlled trials evaluating the effectiveness of CBT for treating psychosis often exclude individuals with severe FTD because it reduces the therapeutic alliance required by the therapy. However, provisional evidence suggests that FTD may not preclude the effectiveness of CBT. Kircher and colleagues have suggested that the following methods should be used in CBT for patients with FTD:

- Practice structuring, summarizing, and feedback methods
- Repeat and clarify the core issues and main emotions that the patient is trying to communicate
- Gently encourage patients to clarify what they are trying to communicate
- Ask patients to clearly state their communication goal
- Ask patients to slow down and explain how one point leads to another
- Help patients identify the links between ideas
- Identify the main affect linked to the thought disorder
- Normalize problems with thinking

== Signs and symptoms ==
Language abnormalities exist in the general population, and do not necessarily indicate a mental health condition. They can also occur in schizophrenia and other disorders (such as mania or depression), or in anyone who may be tired or stressed. To distinguish thought disorder as a mental health condition, professionals may consider patterns of speech, the severity and frequency of symptoms, and any resulting functional impairment.

Symptoms of FTD include derailment, pressured speech, poverty of speech, tangentiality, and thought blocking. The most common forms of FTD observed are tangentiality and circumstantiality. FTD is a hallmark feature of schizophrenia, but is also associated with other conditions that can cause psychosis (including mood disorders, dementia, mania, and neurological diseases). Impaired attention, poor memory, and difficulty formulating abstract concepts may also occur with TD, and can be observed and assessed with mental-status tests such as serial sevens or memory tests.

=== Types ===
Thirty symptoms (or features) of TD have been described, including:

- Alogia: A poverty of speech in amount or content, it is classified as a negative symptom of schizophrenia. When further classifying symptoms, poverty of speech content (which means there is little meaningful content within a normal amount of speech) is a disorganization symptom. Under SANS, thought blocking is considered a part of alogia, and so is increased latency in response.
- Circumstantial speech (also known as circumstantial thinking): An inability to answer a question without providing excessive, unnecessary or irrelevant detail. Circumstantial speech eventually reaches a relevant point, unlike in tangential speech. A patient may answer the question "How have you been sleeping lately?" with "Oh, I go to bed early, so I can get plenty of rest. I like to listen to music or read before bed. Right now I'm reading a good mystery. Maybe I'll write a mystery someday. But it isn't helping, reading I mean. I have been getting only 2 or 3 hours of sleep at night."
- Clanging: instances in which ideas are related only by phonetics (similar or rhyming sounds) rather than actual meaning. This may present as excessive rhyming or alliteration ("Many moldy mushrooms merge out of the mildewy mud on Mondays", or "I heard the bell. Well, hell, then I fell"). It is most commonly seen in the manic phase of bipolar disorder, although it is also often observed in patients with schizophrenia and schizoaffective disorder.
- Derailment (also known as loosening of associations and knight's move thinking): Thought frequently moves from one idea to another with little to no apparent relation, with frequent interruptions in thought. It can appear in both speech and in writing. Derailment is essentially equivalent to a loosening of associations. ("The next day when I'd be going out you know, I took control, like uh, I put bleach on my hair in California").
- Distractible speech: Response changing mid-speech in response to a nearby stimulus ("Then I left San Francisco and moved to ... Where did you get that tie?")
- Echolalia: Echoing of another's speech, once or in repetition. This may involve repeating the last few words of another person's sentences, and is common on the autism spectrum and in Tourette syndrome.
- Evasion (also known as paralogia and perverted logic): The next logical idea in a sequence is replaced with another idea closely related to it, but inappropriate to the current conversational context.
- Flight of ideas: A form of FTD marked by abrupt leaps from one topic to another, possibly with discernible links between successive ideas which may be governed by similarities between subjects or by rhyming, puns, wordplay, or even by innocuous environmental stimuli (such as the sound of birds chirping). It is most characteristic of the manic phase of bipolar disorder.
- Illogicality: Conclusions are reached which do not follow logically (non sequiturs or faulty inferences). "Do you think this will fit in the box?" is answered with, "Well of course; it's brown, isn't it?"
- Incoherence (word salad): Speech which is unintelligible because the individual words are real, but the manner in which they are strung together produces relative gibberish. The question "Why do people comb their hair?" elicits a response like "Because it makes a twirl in life, my box is broken help me blue elephant. Isn't lettuce brave? I like electrons, hello please!"
- Neologisms: Completely new words (or phrases) whose origins and meanings are usually unrecognizable ("I got so angry I picked up a dish and threw it at the geshinker"). These may also involve elisions of two words which are similar in meaning or sound. Although neologisms may refer to words formed incorrectly whose origins are understandable (such as "headshoe" for "hat"), these can be more clearly referred to as word approximations.
- Overinclusion: The failure to eliminate ineffective, inappropriate, irrelevant, or extraneous details associated with a particular stimulus.
- Perseveration: Persistent repetition of words or ideas, even when another person tries to change the subject. ("It's great to be here in Nevada, Nevada, Nevada, Nevada, Nevada.") It may also involve repeatedly giving the same answer to different questions ("Is your name Mary?" "Yes." "Are you in the hospital?" "Yes." "Are you a table?" "Yes"). Perseveration can include palilalia and logoclonia, and may indicate an organic brain disease such as Parkinson's disease.
- Phonemic paraphasia: Mispronunciation or syllables produced out of sequence ("I slipped on the lice and broke my arm").
- Pressured speech: Rapid speech without pauses, which is difficult for others to interrupt.
- Referential thinking: Viewing innocuous stimuli as having a specific meaning for the self ("What's the time?" "It's 7 o'clock. That's my problem").
- Semantic paraphasia: Substitution of inappropriate words ("I slipped on the coat, on the ice I mean, and broke my book").
- Stilted speech: Speech characterized by words or phrases which are flowery, excessive, and pompous ("The attorney comported himself indecorously").
- Tangential speech: Wandering from the topic and never returning to it, failing to produce requested information in response to questions ("Where are you from?" "My dog is from England. They have good fish and chips there. Fish breathe through gills").
- Thought blocking (also known as deprivation of thought and obstructive thought): An abrupt stop in the middle of a train of thought after which the subject may not be able to continue.
- Verbigeration: Meaningless, stereotyped repetition of words or phrases in place of understandable speech; seen in schizophrenia.

== Terminology ==
Psychiatric and psychological glossaries in 2015 and 2017 defined thought disorder as disturbed thinking or cognition which affects communication, language, or thought content including poverty of ideas, neologisms, paralogia, word salad, and delusions (disturbances of thought content and form), and suggested the more-specific terms content thought disorder (CTD) and formal thought disorder (FTD). CTD was defined as a TD characterized by multiple fragmented delusions, and FTD was defined as a disturbance in the form or structure of thinking.

The 2013 DSM-5 only used the term FTD, primarily as a synonym for disorganized thinking and speech. This contrasts with the 1992 ICD-10 (which only used the word "thought disorder", always accompanied with "delusion" and "hallucination") and a 2002 medical dictionary which generally defined thought disorders similarly to the psychiatric glossaries and used the word in other entries as the ICD-10 did.

A 2017 psychiatric text describing thought disorder as a "disorganization syndrome" in the context of schizophrenia:

"Thought disorder" here refers to disorganization of the form of thought and not content. An older use of the term "thought disorder" included the phenomena of delusions and sometimes hallucinations, but this is confusing and ignores the clear differences in the relationships between symptoms that have become apparent over the past 30 years. Delusions and hallucinations should be identified as psychotic symptoms, and thought disorder should be taken to mean formal thought disorders or a disorder of verbal cognition.

— Phenomenology of Schizophrenia (2017), THE SYMPTOMS OF SCHIZOPHRENIA

The text said that some clinicians use the term "formal thought disorder" broadly, referring to abnormalities in thought form with psychotic cognitive signs or symptoms, and studies of cognition and subsyndromes in schizophrenia may refer to FTD as conceptual disorganization or disorganization factor.

Some disagree:

Unfortunately, "thought disorder" is often involved rather loosely to refer to both FTD and delusional content. For the sake of clarity, the unqualified use of the phrase "thought disorder" should be discarded from psychiatric communication. Even the designation "formal thought disorder" covers too wide a territory. It should always be made clear whether one is referring to derailment or loose associations, flight of ideas, or circumstantiality.

— The Mental Status Examination, The Medical Basis of Psychiatry (2016)

Additionally, over the years same types of thought disorders were named differently. For example, desultory thinking, loosening of association, knight’s move thinking and crowding of thought describe the same tendency to jump from one idea to another with little relation. Lack of precise definitions can lead to confusion among clinicians and patients.

== Course, diagnosis, and prognosis ==
It was believed that TD occurred only in schizophrenia, but later findings indicate that it may occur in other psychiatric conditions (including mania) and in people without mental illness. Not all people with schizophrenia have a TD; the condition is not specific to the disease.

When defining thought-disorder subtypes and classifying them as positive or negative symptoms, Nancy Andreasen found that different subtypes of TD occur at different frequencies in those with mania, depression, and schizophrenia. People with mania have pressured speech as the most prominent symptom, and have rates of derailment, tangentiality, and incoherence as prominent as in those with schizophrenia. They are likelier to have pressured speech, distractibility, and circumstantiality.

People with schizophrenia have more negative TD, including poverty of speech and poverty of content of speech, but also have relatively high rates of some positive TD. Derailment, loss of goal, poverty of content of speech, tangentiality and illogicality are particularly characteristic of schizophrenia. People with depression have relatively-fewer TDs; the most prominent are poverty of speech, poverty of content of speech, and circumstantiality. Andreasen noted the diagnostic usefulness of dividing the symptoms into subtypes; negative TDs without full affective symptoms suggest schizophrenia.

She also cited the prognostic value of negative-positive-symptom divisions. In manic patients, most TDs resolve six months after evaluation; this suggests that TDs in mania, although as severe as in schizophrenia, tend to improve. In people with schizophrenia, however, negative TDs remain after six months and sometimes worsen; positive TDs somewhat improve. A negative TD is a good predictor of some outcomes; patients with prominent negative TDs are worse in social functioning six months later. More prominent negative symptoms generally suggest a worse outcome; however, some people may do well, respond to medication, and have normal brain function. Positive symptoms vary similarly.

A prominent TD at illness onset suggests a worse prognosis, including:

- illness begins earlier
- increased risk of hospitalization
- decreased functional outcomes
- increased disability rates
- increased inappropriate social behaviors

TD which is unresponsive to treatment predicts a worse illness course. In schizophrenia, TD severity tends to be more stable than hallucinations and delusions. Prominent TDs are more unlikely to diminish in middle age, compared with positive symptoms. Less-severe TD may occur during the prodromal and residual periods of schizophrenia. Treatment for thought disorder may include psychotherapy, such as cognitive behavior therapy (CBT), and psychotropic medications.

The DSM-5 includes delusions, hallucinations, disorganized thought process (formal thought disorder), and disorganized or abnormal motor behavior (including catatonia) as key symptoms of psychosis. Schizophrenia-spectrum disorders such as schizoaffective disorder and schizophreniform disorder typically consist of prominent hallucinations, delusions and FTD; the latter presents as severely disorganized, bizarre, and catatonic behavior. Psychotic disorders due to medical conditions and substance use typically consist of delusions and hallucinations. The rarer delusional disorder and shared psychotic disorder typically present with persistent delusions. FTDs are commonly found in schizophrenia and mood disorders, with poverty of speech content more common in schizophrenia.

Psychoses such as schizophrenia and bipolar mania are distinguishable from malingering, when an individual fakes illness for other gains, by clinical presentations; malingerers feign thought content with no irregularities in form such as derailment or looseness of association. Negative symptoms, including alogia, may be absent, and chronic thought disorder is typically distressing.

Autism spectrum disorders (ASD) whose diagnosis requires the onset of symptoms before three years of age can be distinguished from early-onset schizophrenia; schizophrenia under age 10 is extremely rare, and ASD patients do not display FTDs. However, it has been suggested that individuals with ASD display language disturbances like those found in schizophrenia; a 2008 study found that children and adolescents with ASD showed significantly more illogical thinking and loose associations than control subjects. The illogical thinking was related to cognitive functioning and executive control; the loose associations were related to communication symptoms and parent reports of stress and anxiety.

Rorschach tests have been useful for assessing TD. A series of inkblots are shown, and responses are analyzed to determine disturbances of thought. The nature of the assessment offers insight into the cognitive processes of another, and how they respond to equivocal stimuli. Hermann Rorschach developed this test to diagnose schizophrenia after realizing that people with schizophrenia gave drastically different interpretations of Klecksographie inkblots from others whose thought processes were considered normal, and it has become one of the most widely used assessment tools for diagnosing TDs.

The Thought Disorder Index (TDI), also known as the Delta Index, was developed to help further determine the severity of TD in verbal responses. TDI scores are primarily derived from verbally-expressed interpretations of the Rorschach test, but TDI can also be used with other verbal samples (including the Wechsler Adult Intelligence Scale). TDI has a twenty-three-category scoring index; each category scores the level of severity on a scale from 0 to 1, with .25 being mild and 1.00 being most severe (0.25, 0.50, 0.75, 1.00).

== Criticism ==
TD has been criticized as being based on circular or incoherent definitions. Symptoms of TD are inferred from disordered speech, based on the assumption that disordered speech arises from disordered thought. Although TD is typically associated with psychosis, similar phenomena can appear in different disorders and leading to misdiagnosis.

A criticism related to the separation of symptoms of schizophrenia into negative or positive symptoms, including TD, is that it oversimplifies the complexity of TD and its relationship to other positive symptoms. Factor analysis has found that negative symptoms tend to correlate with one another, but positive symptoms tend to separate into two groups. The three clusters became known as negative symptoms, psychotic symptoms, and disorganization symptoms. Alogia, a TD traditionally classified as a negative symptom, can be separated into two types: poverty of speech content (a disorganization symptom) and poverty of speech, response latency, and thought blocking (negative symptoms). Positive-negative-symptom diametrics, however, may enable a more accurate characterization of schizophrenia.

== See also ==
- Aphasia
- Auditory processing disorder
- Dream speech
- Speech–language pathology
- Cognitive slippage
