= Communication deviance =

Failure to effectively communicate

Communication deviance (CD) occurs when a speaker fails to effectively communicate and convey meaning to their listeners with confusing speech or illogical patterns. These disturbances can range from vague linguistic references, contradictory statements to more encompassing non-verbal problems at the level of turn-taking.

The term was originally introduced by Lyman Wynne and Margaret Singer in 1963 to describe a communication style found among parents who had children with schizophrenia. According to Wynne, people are able to focus their attention and identify meaning from external stimuli beginning with their interactions, particularly with their parents, during their early years of life. In family communication, deviance is present in the way members acknowledge or affirm one another as well as in task performance.

A 2013 meta-analysis reported that communication deviance is highly prevalent in parents of patients diagnosed with schizophrenia. Another 2000 study have reported significant associations between CD in the parent and thought disorder in the offspring.

But, some research shows that CD may be more likely to be associated with specific cognitive disorganization rather than the criteria of schizophrenia, like DSM-III or DSM-II. Also, findings of CD shows that CD may be associated with children's disorders too, rather than the behavior of preschizophrenic types.

For application purposes: CD has been thought of as a measurement of disorder shown in speech in the subclinical aspect.

However, the mechanisms by which CD impacts on the offspring's cognition are still unknown. Some researchers theorize that, in the case of a high degree of egocentric communication in parents where the sender and the receiver do not speak and listen according to each other's premises, the child develops uncertainty.

The research of psychiatrists and psychoanalysts Lyman Wynne and Theodore Lidz on communication deviance and roles (e.g., pseudo-mutuality, pseudo-hostility, schism and skew) in families of people with schizophrenia also became influential with systems-communications-oriented theorists and therapists.

== Signs and symptoms ==
=== For individual ===
When talking to people with CD, it is difficult to follow and make consistent sharing of attention and meaning. The content of patient's speech may be confusing to listeners, making it difficult to build a shared focus of attention. Stability of CD change as one ages; a 2001 study finds little correlation between young people and follow-up CD, while people at a mean age of 32 have a high correlation with follow-up CD.

=== For parents ===
Research has shown that when communicating with patients who have CD, patients' parents will use similar odd terms and fail to express a sense of closure in their thought even when they talk to their parents. To be more specific, for children with externalizing, “acting out” or “preschizophrenic” behaviors, the parental CD will be higher in maternal and paternal CD was found to be more significant only in which children with high externalizing behaviors. To be more specific, data analysis shows that a large magnitude (g = .97) is linked between maternal CD and offspring psychotic disorder.

== Cause ==
=== Genetic ===
CD is associated with genetics, which is a genetic vulnerability for schizophrenia. Studies show that CD is associated with schizophrenia spectrum disorders history in the family, among their parents and siblings.

Children’s level of CD will link to the way of communication between parents. The parents who both have a pathologic affective style of communication will lead to a high level of CD in their children. If the parents have a healthier style of communication, the levels of CD in their children will be lower.

But studies of the high level of parental CD are mostly based on English-speaking countries and white subjects. Thus, the findings lack generalisability.

=== Environment ===
In the cultural aspect, CD was more common in intercultural encounters, especially when there were discrepancies in communication styles and norms, the misunderstanding can lead to CD.

In the social aspect, children with self-isolation or lack of social support have more opportunities to get communication deviance, because they lack communication practice and have communication difficulties. So, some researchers have suggested that more social support can help children reduce their communication difficulties and reduce the level of CD. But the reliability of the results still needs to be replicated.

== Diagnosis ==
There are two main approaches to prevent CD. The first is the 'clinical high risk' approach. It puts a premium on early treatment, the ultimate goal of this approach is prevention. The second one is secondary and tertiary prevention, this approach can reflect the need for intervention focusing on the whole family. Also, some studies point out that when considering the prevention of CD, the relationship between family and their children should be taken into account.

== Management ==
=== Psychological treatment ===
Psychological treatment can be divided into four main elements:

1. Holding seminars for parents which give them instructions on schizophrenia and how to treat a schizophrenic child
2. Problem-solving session
3. Milieu therapy: to create an 'emotional climate' environment by a depressed emotion for patients
4. Establishing a good social network for patients

=== Family treatment ===
The family treatment mainly includes education, communication and problem-solving techniques. Study shows that family treatment will have a more effective improvement than individual treatment.

== Cost ==
In comparison to control subjects or patients with other non-psychotic disturbances, parents of schizophrenic patients have substantially higher CD levels. The maternal CD was found to be higher than patrilineal CD. Also, Paternal CD was found to be a higher level in families whose children were with higher externalizing behaviors.

== Measurement of CD ==
CD levels can be measured by Thematic Apperception Test (TAT) and Rorschach test.

== See also ==
- Alogia
- Infodumping
- Psychosis
- Stilted speech
