= Derailment (thought disorder) =

Thought disorder in psychiatry

In psychiatry, derailment (also known as loosening of association, asyndesis, asyndetic thinking, knight's move thinking, entgleisen, disorganised thinking) categorises any speech comprising sequences of unrelated or barely related ideas; the topic often changes from one sentence to another.

== Disorder ==
In a mild manifestation, this thought disorder is characterized by slippage of ideas further and further from the point of a discussion. Derailment can often be manifestly caused by intense emotions such as euphoria or hysteria. Some of the synonyms given above (loosening of association, asyndetic thinking) are used by some authors to refer just to a loss of goal: discourse that sets off on a particular idea, wanders off and never returns to it. A related term is tangentiality—it refers to off-the-point, oblique or irrelevant answers given to questions. In some studies on creativity, knight's move thinking—while describing a similarly loose association of ideas—is not considered a mental disorder or the hallmark of one; it is sometimes used as a synonym for lateral thinking.

== Examples ==
- "The next day when I'd be going out you know, I took control, like uh, I put bleach on my hair in California."—given by Nancy C. Andreasen
- "I think someone's infiltrated my copies of the cases. We've got to case the joint. I don't believe in joints, but they do hold your body together."—given by Elyn Saks.

== History ==
Entgleisen ('derailment' in German) was first used with this meaning by Carl Schneider in 1930. The term asyndesis was introduced by N. Cameron in 1938, while loosening of association was introduced by A. Bleuler in 1950. The phrase knight's move thinking was first used in the context of pathological thinking by the psychologist Peter McKellar in 1957, who hypothesized that individuals with schizophrenia fail to suppress divergent associations. Derailment was used with this meaning by Kurt Schneider in 1959.

== See also ==
- Nonsense
- Non sequitur (logic) and non sequitur (literary device)
- Red herring
- Relevance logic
- Schizophasia
- SCIgen, a program that generates nonsense research papers by grammatically combining snippets; many of the sentences generated are individually plausible
- Tip-of-the-tongue
- Train of thought
