= Laconic speech =

Laconic speech may mean:

- alogia - a thought impoverishment observable through speech and language use
- laconic phrase - a concise or terse statement, especially a blunt and elliptical rejoinder
