= Forced speech =

Forced speech may refer to:

- Compelled speech, statements that are coerced by legal means
- Pressured speech, a medical condition
