= Cognitive slippage =

Type of thought disorder

Cognitive slippage is considered a milder and sub-clinical presentation of formal thought disorder observed via unusual use of language. It is often identified when a person attempts to make tangential connections between concepts that are not immediately understandable to listeners. When observed repeatedly, this is taken as evidence for unusual, maladaptive or illogical thinking patterns.

Cognitive slippage is typically assessed in the context of mental health evaluations, but there is ongoing debate about how to best quantify this type of unusual language usage in research settings. Cognitive slippage is believed to exist on a continuum which can be observed in its most extreme forms among some individuals with schizophrenia (e.g., word salad). Several mental disorders are known to co-occur with cognitive slippage. Although cognitive slippage is associated with difficulties in communication, it is not necessarily indicative of lower intelligence.

== Examples ==
An example of cognitive slippage:

"List some types of cars."
"Let's see, there's Ford, Chevrolet, Toyota, Japan, Rising Sun, Hiroshima, Atomic Bomb, Enola Gay, oh and Miata."

The inclusion of extraneous items in the list is evidence of cognitive slippage. Although the concepts such as Toyota, Japan, Rising Sun, etc. are all related, the relation does not fall under the category of the initial prompt: types of cars.

Another example:

"What animals did you see at the zoo today?"
"We saw tigers, bears, Dolphins, the Baltimore Ravens, the Packers, Carolina Panthers, jaguars, lions, and otters."

Here we see the slip occur between animal names and football teams with animals as their mascot. As the person lists animals they saw at the zoo, they mention "bears" and "dolphins" which double as the names of NFL teams. This results in a "slip" to a tangentially related list of football teams then back again to animals after the mention of the Carolina Panthers relates to the other big cats they saw - jaguars and lions. The cognitive slippage is associated with an inability to identify and disregard these extraneous connections. It results in patterns of speech and associations similar to those seen here.

== Theory ==
In 1962, Paul E. Meehl emphasized that thought disorder was a critical component of schizophrenia diagnosis. He coined the term "cognitive slippage" to describe a more mild form of thought disorder that he believed was still relevant. He recognized that even in the absence of more severe forms of thought disorder, individuals with schizophrenia exhibited more cognitive slippage than non-schizophrenic individuals. As a result, Meehl deemed thought disorder a necessary component of the disorder for diagnoses, regardless of severity. He declared that any characterization of either schizophrenia or schizotypy that lacked cognitive slippage as a component was unacceptable and he insisted that cognitive slippage, interpersonal aversiveness, anhedonia, and ambivalence were the universal "core behavior traits" of all schizotypic individuals. He also noted that the amount of slippage can vary from case to case, with some highly anxious individuals exhibiting less slippage than some minimally anxious individuals. This suggests that cognitive slippage may be affected by altering the effect of the individual, but Meehl mentions that this feature is not groundbreaking or unique to cognitive slippage.

Meehl (1962) also noted that cognitive slippage occurred in some typically developed relatives of individuals with schizophrenia. Though the findings were preliminary, he noted that among a group of ten individuals with schizophrenia, they were able to detect mild thought disorder in at least one parent of each individual. He thus suggested that future research into this discovery should be a priority of schizophrenia researchers. Meehl also sought to understand where the cognitive dysfunctions associated with schizophrenia stemmed from, yet he found cognitive slippage a difficult symptom to parse out. He considered that, on some level, "everybody has to learn how to think straight," and supposed there could be a social learning component to the development of organized, rational thought and speech.

Meehl noticed that slippage occurred even when an individual was trying fervently to communicate clearly. He considered a neurological explanation that suggested cognitive slippage was tied to "synaptic slippage," or an error in the electrical transmission of messages from neuron to neuron in the brain. He suggested this issue was caused by an error in cell selectivity, meaning the wrong neuron received the message. According to this theory, "primary cognitive slippage" refers to the slippage at the central nervous system synapse as a result of an error in neural transmission. The observable behavior of disorganized speech, as a result of the transmission error, would be classified as "secondary cognitive slippage". He also contemplated the possibility that cognitive slippage could stem from different underlying causes based on the disorder it was a part of.

== Measure of cognitive slippage ==
The Cognitive Slippage Scale (CSS) was introduced in 1985 by Miers and Raulin. The CSS is composed of 35 self-reported true or false questions intended to identify speech deficits and disorganized, confused thinking. Higher scores on this test indicate a higher level of cognitive slippage. The test has been shown to be applicable and accurate to both clinical and non-clinical populations. Examples of questions included on the test are, "Often when I am talking I feel that I am not making sense," and "Sometimes my thoughts just disappear.".

With a few exceptions, this scale has seldom been evaluated for its reliability and validity. The validity of the CSS was assessed in 1992 by comparing clinical and non-clinical, undergraduate samples. The reliability of the CSS was assessed using Cronbach's alpha, a coefficient between 0 and 1 that indicates that the items on a scale have greater covariance as it approaches 1. They found that the CSS had a coefficient of 0.89 for the clinical participants with schizophrenia, and 0.86 for the non-clinical, undergraduate participants. They also suggested the CSS has adequate test-retest reliability by re-administering the CSS after a 4-week period.

In 2013, a study conducted by Loas, Dimassi, Monetes, and Yon proposed that validity could also be assessed by comparing the CSS results of healthy first-degree relatives of individuals with schizophrenia to those without it. They recruited 27 first-degree relatives of individuals with schizophrenia and thirty first-degree relatives of individuals without schizophrenia. All participants were administered the French version of the CSS. The results indicate that the first-degree relatives of individuals with schizophrenia scored significantly higher on the CSS than did the first-degree relatives of typically developed individuals.

== Research on specific disorders ==
=== As a symptom of schizophrenia ===
Cognitive slippage is characterized as a mild symptom of schizophrenia. Schizophrenia is a psychiatric illness defined by both abnormal behaviors and cognitive dysfunctions. Formal thought disorder (FTD) is characterized by problems with thought, language, and communication and is considered to be the key feature of the cognitive dysfunction component of schizophrenia. As Meehl suggested, cognitive slippage is a milder form of FTD, making it also a key component of schizophrenia.

In considering the genetic element of schizophrenia, researchers have examined the presence of symptoms, such as cognitive slippage, in first degree relatives. For example, Oltmanns (1978) looked at the prevalence of cognitive slippage in the children of individuals with schizophrenia. For their purposes, they defined "cognitive slippage" to include associative disturbances, difficulties in thinking, and errors in reasoning. The researchers administered an object sorting task to 156 children of schizophrenic individuals, 102 children of depressed individuals, and 139 children of healthy parents. The task required participants to either sort objects or explain the reasoning behind a sorted group of objects. The task was designed to target responses that would differ noticeably between individuals with schizophrenia and without schizophrenia. All the participants were children between the ages of 6 and 15. Their responses were then sorted as either superordinate, complex, vague, or thematic. The children of parents with schizophrenia made fewer superordinate responses and more complex responses than the control children. Though small, the findings were reliable, and suggest that the children of individuals with schizophrenia are more prone to the cognitive dysfunctions associated with cognitive slippage.

The loose definition of cognitive slippage can make the symptom difficult to identify, so Braatz (1970) designed a study to determine if preference intransitivity could be used as an indicator of cognitive slippage. He proposed that from a logical standpoint, intransitivities in preference would result from cognitive slippage. Preference intransitivity occurs when one's preferences and values lead to potentially unresolvable conflicts. He administered a scale of 120 items meant to judge preferences of both schizophrenia patients and healthy controls and found that individuals with schizophrenia endorse more intransitive judgments than healthy individuals. Though he acknowledges that the scale in its current form is underdeveloped, his findings suggest that further research into the connection between preference intransitivity and cognitive slippage could result in a scale powerful enough to aid schizophrenia diagnosis. He also suggests future research could expand the scale to apply in cases other than clinical schizophrenia.

Kagan and Oltmanns (1981) also made an attempt to clear up some of the ambiguity surrounding cognitive slippage among individuals with schizophrenia. Their research sought to develop an objective index of cognitive slippage. They administered a word matching task to individuals with schizophrenia, individuals with affective disorders, and normal controls. They found that the individuals with schizophrenia did, in fact, perform differently on the task than the normal controls, but that they performed similarly to the individuals with affective disorders. This creates an issue as it complicates the feasibility of the task being used to measure cognitive slippage specifically to identify schizophrenia.

=== As it relates to schizotypy ===
Meehl (1962) identified cognitive slippage as a fundamental component of schizotypy. Thus individuals that do not meet full diagnostic criteria for schizophrenia, yet fall on the spectrum of schizotypy, still exhibit high levels of cognitive slippage. Due to this underpinning, The Referential Thinking Scale was designed as a measure to get at the underlying cognitive process of cognitive slippage. By targeting referential thinking, a measurable behavior, the idea was the scale could detect schizotypy based on the presence of cognitive slippage. Eckblad & Chapman (1983) identified magical ideation as the aspect of cognitive slippage critical to schizotypy. They define Magical Ideation as magical and superstitious beliefs about reality reliant on false causal relations between events. By this definition, cognitive slippage can manifest as fallacious, causal connections between correlated or unrelated events.

Gooding, Tallent, And Hegyi (2001), found that in addition to greater cognitive slippage, schizotypic individuals performed worse on the Wisconsin Card Sorting Test, which was designed to assess overall high-level cognitive functioning. Specifically, they found that individuals who only endorsed the negative symptoms of schizotypy reported lower levels of cognitive slippage than those who endorsed both positive and negative schizotypy symptoms. Due to the wide variety of individuals on the schizotypal spectrum, McCarthy (2015) suggests further research should be conducted on individuals at different points on the spectrum in order to enhance understanding of symptom severity and the appropriate use of measures such as the Cognitive Slippage Scale.

=== As a symptom of personality disorders ===
==== Schizoid ====
Among individuals with schizoid personality disorder, cognitive slippage manifests as an inability to control associations made within the context of things such as dreams, creative thoughts and free association. The slippage results in an inability to override subordinate associations between topics in order to purposefully acknowledge clearer, surface level associations. Such individuals have no difficulty making links between topics, but rather are unable to prioritize which links are more salient and thus suppress less applicable links. For instance, the individual in the example above has no difficulty making connections between various zoo animals, or NFL teams, but is unable to intentionally suppress the NFL associations in order to prioritize and answer the questions specifically regarding zoo animals.

==== Narcissism ====
A study was conducted using the Rorschach test to evaluate ego differences between individuals with borderline and narcissistic personality disorders. Responses to the test given by the narcissist included more answers indicative of cognitive dysfunctions they described as "cognitive slippage". Researchers suggest the slippage results from the narcissist attempting to combine idealized components of an object into a cohesive entity. This was demonstrated by individuals who interpreted the inkblots as two discrete objects somehow joined in the middle (e.g. "A head of two foxes back to back sharing a crown.").

=== As it relates to subclinical psychosis ===
In addition to inclusion as diagnostic criteria, the presence of cognitive slippage as a form of formal thought disorder is considered to be associated with psychosis proneness. Martin and Chapman (1982) determined that college students at risk for psychosis displayed signs of cognitive slippage on a referential communication task. Allen, Chapman, and Chapman (1987) identified college students who scored high on the Per-Mag Scale, a measure designed to identify thought processes indicative of psychosis. They found that most of these high-scoring students also exhibited signs of cognitive slippage on two measures of it. Of the students who scored very high on the Per-Mag, those who also scored above the mean on a depression scale were the most likely to demonstrate cognitive slippage. Additionally, Edell (1987) reinforced the idea that although individuals with sub-clinical psychopathology exhibit more severe thought disorder on unstructured tests, they perform relatively normally on more structured measures of cognition.

=== Thought disorder and autism ===
Dykens, Volkman, and Glick (1991) considered the relationship between thought disorder and high-functioning adult autism by utilizing both objective and projective measures. They collected objective data using the Thought, Language, and Communication Disorder Scale, and projective data through use of the Rorschach test. In their definition of "cognitive slippage," they broke the dysfunction down into processes such as "incongruous combinations," "fabulized combinations," "deviant responses," and "inappropriate logic." Their findings suggest that individuals with autism display more disordered thinking than typically developed individuals. To explain this, they suggest that cognitive slippage is rooted in difficulty with complex perceptual processing, a known feature of autism. Another study used Rorschach inkblots to compare individuals with Asperger syndrome to high-functioning individuals with Autism. They found that individuals with Asperger syndrome tended to exhibit greater levels of disordered and disorganized thinking in their responses than the typically developed individuals.

=== As it relates to eating disorders ===
In response to implications that cognitive dysfunctions were rooted in eating disorder etiology, researchers Strauss and Ryan (1988) conducted a study to compare the rates of logical errors, cognitive slippage, and conceptual complexity among individuals with eating disorders compared to their healthy counterparts. They evaluated 19 restrictive anorexic individuals, 14 purging anorexic individuals, 17 bulimic individuals, 15 individuals with sub-clinical eating pathology, and 17 healthy control individuals. Though they found differences between the anorexic groups and the others in regards to logical errors, there were no significant differences between any group on rates of cognitive slippage.

=== As it relates to test anxiety ===
Broadbent et al. (1982) developed the Cognitive Failures Questionnaire (CFQ), a self-report measure designed to identify the presence of "cognitive slippage." For the purposes of the CFQ, however, they used this term to refer to lapses in attention, difficulty processing information, memory issues, perception problems, and complications in decision-making. As such, their definition tapped into issues such as "forgetfulness" or "inattention" rather than the clinically significant cognitive dysfunction defined by Meehl. Yates, Hannell, and Lippett (1985) designed a study to evaluate the predictive value of the CFQ as a means to identify psychological vulnerability under stressful conditions, such as during a test. 72 female participants were administered the CFQ as well as the Test Anxiety Scale as they completed two tasks - the former of which, they were told, was a practice test for the later. It was found that during the second test condition, subjects did report more "cognitive slippage" in the form of mind-wandering and distractibility.

== See also ==
- Schizophrenia
- Schizophasia
- Schizotypy
- Magical thinking
