= Cognitive Failures Questionnaire =

Self-report inventory of cognitive slippage

The Cognitive Failures Questionnaire (CFQ) is a self-report inventory of cognitive slippage in the form of failures in everyday actions, perceptions and attention, and memory. It was developed by Donald Broadbent and others in 1982 at the University of Oxford's Department of Experimental Psychology. The authors originally intended for the questionnaire to measure three distinct factors: perception, memory, and motor function. Subsequent analysis has found four distinct factors measured, which partially overlap with the intended factors.

One study found that it is correlated with measures of neuroticism, including as measured by the Eysenck Personality Questionnaire, thus supporting the so-called mental-noise hypothesis of neuroticism.
