= Scale for the Assessment of Negative Symptoms =

Psychological diagnostic rubric

The Scale for the Assessment of Negative Symptoms (SANS) is a rating scale that mental health professionals use to measure negative symptoms in schizophrenia. Negative symptoms are those conspicuous by their absence—lack of concern for one's appearance, and lack of language and communication skills, for example. Nancy Andreasen developed the scale and first published it in 1984. SANS splits assessment into five domains. Within each domain it rates separate symptoms from 0 (absent) to 5 (severe). The scale is closely linked to the Scale for the Assessment of Positive Symptoms (SAPS), which was published a few years later. These tools are available for clinicians and for research.

== Background ==
Schizophrenia is a severe mental illness characterized by a range of behaviors, including hallucinations and delusions. Hallucinations refer to disorders involving the sensory systems, and are most often manifested as seeing or hearing things (e.g., voices) that do not exist. Delusions include odd or unusual beliefs such as grandiosity or paranoia. Both hallucinations and delusions are inconsistent with reality. Other symptoms of schizophrenia include bizarre behavior, odd posture or movements, facial grimacing, loss of, or indifference to self-help skills (grooming, washing, toileting, feeding, etc.). Schizophrenia may also be marked by a host of social and communication deficits, such as social withdrawal, odd use of language, including excessive use of made up words (neologisms), incomprehensible combinations of words (word salad) or overall poverty of speech. The symptoms are often classified into two broad categories: positive and negative symptoms. Positive symptoms refer to those behaviors or condition that are present in schizophrenia but that are not present under typical conditions (hallucinations, delusions). Negative symptoms refer to those behaviors that are conspicuous because of their absence (grooming, language, communication). Several measures or rating scales have been developed to assess the positive and negative aspects of schizophrenia.

== Items ==
=== Affective Flattening or Blunting ===
- Unchanging Facial Expression
- Decreased Spontaneous Movements
- Paucity of Expressive Gestures
- Poor Eye Contact
- Affective Nonresponsivity
- Lack of Vocal Inflections
- Global Rating of Affective Flattening

=== Alogia ===
- Poverty of Speech
- Poverty of Content of Speech
- Blocking
- Increased Latency of Response
- Global Rating of Alogia

=== Avolition – Apathy ===
- Grooming and Hygiene
- Impersistence at Work or School
- Physical Anergia
- Global Rating of Avolition – Apathy

=== Anhedonia – Asociality ===
- Recreational Interests and Activities
- Sexual Interest and Activity
- Ability to Feel Intimacy and Closeness
- Relationships with Friends and Peers
- Global Rating of Anhedonia-Asociality

=== Attention ===
- Social Inattentiveness
- Inattentiveness During Mental Status Testing
- Global Rating of Attention

== See also ==
- Brief Psychiatric Rating Scale (BPRS)
- Diagnostic classification and rating scales used in psychiatry
- Positive and Negative Syndrome Scale (PANSS)
- Scale for the Assessment of Positive Symptoms (SAPS)
