= Clanging =

Symptom of mental disorders

Clanging (or clang associations) is a symptom of mental disorders, primarily found in patients with schizophrenia and bipolar disorder. This symptom is also referred to as association chaining, and sometimes, glossomania.

Lucas C. Steuber defines it as "repeating chains of words that are associated semantically or phonetically[,] with no relevant context". This may include compulsive rhyming or alliteration without apparent logical connection between words.

Clanging refers specifically to behavior that is situationally inappropriate. While a poet rhyming is not evidence of mental illness, disorganized speech that impedes the patient's ability to communicate is a disorder in itself, often seen in schizophrenia.

== Example ==
This can be seen by a section of a 1974 transcript of a patient with schizophrenia:

We are all felines. Siamese cat balls. They stand out. I had a cat, a manx, still around here somewhere. You'll know him when you see him. His name is GI Joe; he's black and white. I have a goldfish too, like a clown. Happy Halloween down. Down.

The speaker makes semantic chain associations on the topic of cats, to the colour of her cat, which (either the topic of colours/patterns, or the topic of pets) leads her to jump from her goldfish to the associated clown, a point she reaches via the word clownfish. The patient also exhibits a pattern of rhyming and associative clanging: clown to Halloween (presumably an associative clang) to down.

This example highlights how the speaker was distracted by the sound or meaning of her own words, and led herself off the topic, sentence by sentence. In essence, it is a form of derailment driven by self-monitoring.

== As a type of formal thought disorder ==
Formal thought disorders (FTD) are a syndrome with several symptoms, leading to thought, language and communication problems, being a core feature in schizophrenia.

Thought disorders are measured using the Thought, Language and Communication Scale (TLC) developed by Andreasen in 1986. This measures tendencies of 18 subtypes of formal thought disorder (with strong inter-coder reliability) including clanging as a type of FTD.

The TLC scale for FTD sub-types remains the standard and most inclusive – so clanging is officially recognised as a type of FTD.

There has been much debate about whether FTDs are a symptom of thought or language, yet the basis for FTD analysis is the verbal behaviour of the patients. As a result, whether abnormal speech among individuals with schizophrenia is a result of abnormal neurology, abnormal thought or linguistic processes – researchers agree that people with schizophrenia do have abnormal language.

== Occurrences in mental disorders ==
Clanging is associated with the irregular thinking apparent in psychotic mental illnesses (e.g. mania and schizophrenia).

=== In schizophrenia ===
Formal Thought Disorders are one of five characteristic symptoms of schizophrenia according to the DSM-IV-TR. FTD symptoms such as Glossomania are correlated to schizophrenia spectrum disorders and to a family history of schizophrenia. In an analysis of speech in patients with schizophrenia compared to controls, Steuber found that glossomania (association chaining) is a characteristic of speech in schizophrenic patients - despite no significant difference between normal controls and individuals with schizophrenia.

=== In mania/bipolar disorder ===
Gustav Aschaffenburg found that manic individuals generated these "clang-associations" roughly 10–50 times more than non-manic individuals. Aschaffenburg also found that the frequency of these associations increased for all individuals as they became more fatigued.

Andreasen found that when comparing Formal Thought Disorder symptoms between people with schizophrenia and people with Mania, that there was greater reported incidence of clang associations of people with mania.

=== In depression ===
Research investigated by Steuber found significant difference of glossomania occurrences for patients with schizophrenia compared to patients with depression.. Additionally, it was found that the transcripts from schizophrenics had significant occurrences of illogicality and peculiar word choice. These three categories (glossomania, illogicality, and peculiar word choice) had no occurrence in the depression transcripts.

== Disagreements in the literature ==
Being a niche area of symptoms of mental disorders, there have been disagreements in the definitions of clanging, and how it may nor may not fall under the subset of Formal Thought Disorder symptoms in schizophrenia. Steuber argues that although it is a FTD, that it should come under the umbrella of the subtype 'distractibility'.

Moreover, due to limited research there have been discrepancies in the definition of clanging used: an alternative definition for clanging is: "word selection based on phonemic relatedness, rather than semantic meaning; frequently manifest as rhyming". Here it is evident that the semantic association chains are not included as part of the definition seen at the start – even though it is the more widely used definition of clanging and glossomania (where the terms are used interchangeably).

== Biological factors ==
Understanding of such language impairments and FTDs take a biological approach.

Candidate genes for such vulnerability of schizophrenia are the FOXP2 (which is linked to a familial language disorder and autism) and dysbindin 1 genes43,44. This distal explanation not only does not explain clanging specifically, but also fails to include other environmental influences on the development of schizophrenia. Moreover, if a person does develop schizophrenia, it does not guarantee they have the symptom of clanging.

Sass and Pienkos 2013 suggest that a more nuanced understanding of structural (neural changes) patterns that occur in a sufferer's brain could be important in understanding the disorder. However, more research is required into not only understanding the causes of such symptoms, but how it works.

== See also ==
- Thought disorder
- Word salad
- Schizophrenia
- Bipolar disorder

== Sources ==
- Steuber, Lucas Carl (2011). Disordered Thought, Disordered Language: A corpus-based description of the speech of individuals undergoing treatment for schizophrenia (Thesis). doi:10.15760/etd.63. OCLC 775308103. ProQuest 904159072.
