= Right hemisphere brain damage =

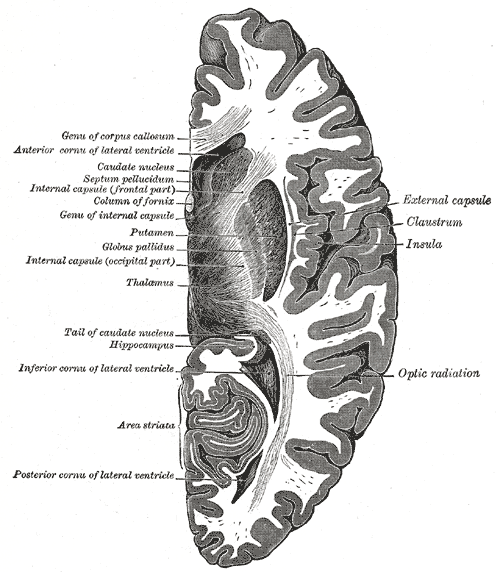
- Right cerebral hemisphere (coronal plane)
- Specialty: Psychiatry, Neurology

Right hemisphere brain damage (RHD) is the result of injury to the right cerebral hemisphere. The right hemisphere of the brain coordinates tasks for functional communication, which include problem solving, memory, and reasoning. Deficits caused by right hemisphere brain damage vary depending on the location of the damage.

== Signs and symptoms ==
=== Visual processing ===
Individuals with right hemisphere damage exhibit deficits in visual processing. They are only able to recognize the right half of a picture, symbol, or text. rather than seeing the concept as a whole. In a now widely replicated experiment, individuals with RHD showed an inability to grasp the whole of a given concept. These individuals were told to recreate an image of many small triangles making up the shape of an M. Their replications succeeded in depicting the triangle, but their arrangement of triangles was random, and evidently they only grasped the parts, and not the whole structure. Individuals with RHD also seem to struggle with inference revision, indicating an inability to drop focus, once given to a particular concept. In an experiment by Bloise and Tompkins, RHD individuals performed markedly worse at revising an inference they had about a paragraph when new information was presented that made their reading wrong. This was a sort of garden path paragraph, that RHD individuals had a hard time grasping.

=== Cognitive and communicative ===
==== General ====
Patients with right hemisphere brain damage most commonly have difficulties with attention, perception, learning, memory, recognition and expression of emotion, and neglect. Other frequently occurring, though slightly less common, deficits include reasoning and problem solving, awareness, and orientation. It is also common for patients with right hemisphere damage to have a flat affect, lack of emotional expression, while speaking. Additionally, these patients commonly have difficulty recognizing other people's emotions when expressed through facial expressions and tone of voice. This lack of ability to recognize emotion suggests individuals have an impaired theory of mind, the ability to recognize the thoughts and feelings of others outside of one's self. Although these deficits alone may complicate therapy, the patient may also exhibit anosognosia, or ignorance of his or her impairments. Due to possible anosognosia, it is common for patients to not become frustrated or upset when they are unable to complete tasks they were previously able to complete.

Unlike those of people with aphasia, the speech patterns of individuals with right hemisphere damage are not typically characterized by "word finding problems, paraphasias, circumlocutions, or impaired phonological processing." Circumlocution in persons with RHD tends to center around general concepts, not specific words. For example, in describing what brought a RHD-affected individual to the hospital, though the patient would likely remember the word "stroke" and other specific words to describe his situation, the RHD impairment to his discourse level and cognitive processes would likely prevent him from describing the situation in a coherent manner.

==== Linguistic impairments ====
===== Syntax =====
The syntax of RHD-affected individuals tends to be "accurate and varied"; unlike people with aphasia, they tend not to have difficulty with word retrieval. In addition, people with right hemisphere damage usually understand the literal meaning of most statements. Linguistically, in cases in which RHD patients seem to have syntactic deficits, they are typically the result of problems with semantic processing.

===== Semantics =====
In a 1962 study, Eisenson observed a "looseness of verbalization" in RHD-affected individuals, noting that right hemisphere damage appears to affect "relatively abstract language formulations." According to Eisenson, this is evidence that the right hemisphere likely controls "super- or extra-ordinary" language function. In other words, RHD patients have trouble with higher-level language tasks (relating to semantic and lexical processing) less common in day-to-day, average discourse. In describing semantic deficits in persons with right hemisphere damage, a distinction must be drawn between convergent and divergent semantic processing. Tasks involving convergent semantic processing ("relatively straightforward linguistic tasks in which the number of responses is limited"), which involve the most straightforward meanings of words, are not nearly as difficult for RHD patients as tasks involving divergent semantic processing (tasks that "elicit a wide range of meanings which may diverge from a single semantic concept to include non-dominant meanings that are alternate, connotative, and/or less familiar").

In terms of convergent semantic processing, people with RHD do not demonstrate semantic impairment at the phonemic level, nor do they tend to have difficulty understanding the primary meanings of individual words. Their comprehension of simple, unambiguous sentences also remains intact, as does their basic word retrieval; this evidence suggests that these tasks are functions of the left hemisphere. On the other hand, the right hemisphere is more involved in recognizing multiple and non-primary meanings of words, divergent semantic processing tasks that are impaired in individuals with right hemisphere damage. Along these lines, RHD patients experience difficulty with verbal fluency; in an experiment in which RHD-affected individuals were asked to name items within a category, they tended to suggest objects connected in more ways than one (with many characteristics in common). For example, when asked to name vegetables, people with RHD would name spinach, cabbage, and lettuce, which share the attributes not only of being vegetables but also of being "green and leafy." Such results "support a model of semantic processing in which the [right hemisphere] is superior in generating multiple, loosely connected meanings with little overlap," a function clearly affected by right hemisphere damage.

As a result of pragmatic deficits, individuals with right hemisphere damage have a hard time understanding the figurative cues in language and tend to simply understand sentences from their literal meanings. For instance if someone were to say, Joey took the lion's share, they would assume Joey took the portion that belonged to the lion as opposed to the colloquial meaning-the majority. On the same vein, they also do not understand pragmatics and the underlying clues language might have. Because of this, implicit commands or suggestions in sentences are lost on people with right hemisphere damage. In addition, they have a hard time staying on topic during a conversation and therefore show a deficit in topic maintenance. Some however may stick to the main topic, but bury it in their speech with a large amount of detail that is not relevant to the main point. They also tend to show a lack of awareness for the knowledge they share with those they are communicating with and will mention people or things for which others do not have a reference.

==== Discourse impairments ====
Considering the highly contextual and often ambiguous nature of discourse, it tends to be the area of communication most affected by right hemisphere damage. RHD is particularly evident in the inference patterns of affected individuals. Though RHD patients are typically capable of making basic inferences about situations, more subtle inferences key to discourse and conversation are often severely impaired. As Penelope Myers notes, much empirical research has shown that persons with right hemisphere damage are "significantly impaired in generating inferences about individual elements of pictured scenes," and, most significantly, in compiling information about the individual elements together to understand the situation at-large. This impairment also applies to written or spoken text. For example, Beeman (1993) cites a patient who mentioned his ability to read "straightforward texts" but noted that he had stopped reading novels with multiple characters as, in the patient's words, "I can't put it all together."

===== Experimentation with Norman Rockwell paintings =====
As further evidence of this phenomenon, there has been research done with right hemisphere damaged patients using Norman Rockwell pieces. In these experiments, participants are shown a painting, without the title attached, and are asked to describe what is happening in the scene. As can be expected, there are variances between the answers of people with right hemisphere damage and no brain damage. These experiments have provided further evidence for the idea that individuals with right hemisphere damage have a hard time recognizing emotions of others as they do not mention them when asked to describe the paintings. In addition, this process has suggested that they do not pick up relevant cues and have difficulty incorporating the small details they do notice together to form a big picture. When actually describing the paintings, patients either give the experimenter too much description of what is happening, without addressing the overall theme of the piece, or provide them with a very basic one sentence description about what they see. After analyzing and comparing the descriptions of participants with no brain damage and those with right hemisphere damage, the researchers found that those with right hemisphere damage used twice as many words than those without brain damage even after the researchers took out the part of the descriptions that appeared to be tangential.

Furthermore, RHD-affected individuals experience deficits in inference-revision capabilities. As an example [from Brownell et al. (1986)], when presented with the sentence, "Barbara became too bored to finish the history book," both RHD subjects and control subjects assumed Barbara was reading the book. However, when subjects were then presented with a second sentence, "She had already spent five years writing it," control subjects altered their initial inference, whereas RHD subjects demonstrated great difficulty revising their inferences and drawing a broad, revised conclusion about the information at hand. RHD patients' difficulty with understanding non-literal meanings is also a significant cause of discourse impairment. As noted above, right hemisphere damage affects understanding of figurative language such as idioms, as a result of the right hemisphere's role in activating non-literal and peripheral meanings. As a result of their difficulties understanding alternate meanings and making situational inferences, people with right hemisphere damage face significant challenges in terms of discourse.

Difficulties with communication are likely to be linked to a patient's cognitive deficits. For example, communication breakdown may result because a patient with right hemisphere brain damage fails to observe appropriate social conventions or because the patient may ramble and fail to recognize appropriate times to take conversational turns. The patient may also have difficulty comprehending sarcasm, irony, and other paralinguistic aspects of communication. Although they do not understand irony, it has been found that patients with right hemisphere damage can provide a clear punchline for a joke, but are lost when the punchline has to connect multiple ideas or themes. Along with sticking to the main point of a story, patients may find it difficult to extract the theme of a story, or arrange sentences based on the theme of a story.

Nespoulous, Code, Virbel and Lecours studied speech of those with different kinds of aphasias and coined a term for the speech patterns of those with right hemisphere damage. According to them, these patients engage in modalizing speech which is made up speech about the patient's perspective on the real world. They found that those with right hemisphere damage contrast those with Wernicke's Aphasia as those patients use referential speech which Nespoulous et al. identify as speech pertaining to the real world and what is occurring in it. With referential speech, the patients describe what they did, but leave out their attitude towards it. In modalizing speech, a description of the real world is missing, but they include their emotional attitude

=== Motor and sensory ===
A frequently occurring motor deficit is left-sided hemiparesis (in strokes affecting the motor cortex). A less common motor deficit in this population is dysphagia.

Patients with right hemisphere brain damage often display sensory deficits such as left neglect, in which they ignore everything in the left visual field. This neglect can be present throughout many daily activities including reading, writing and self-care activities. For example, individuals with left neglect typically leave out details on the neglected side of drawings or try to draw out all the details on the nonneglected side. Homonymous hemianopsia is another sensory deficit that is sometimes observed in this population.

=== Pragmatic and Conversation-Level Impairments ===
Individuals with RHD often experience deficits in pragmatic communication, including turn-taking, maintaining shared knowledge, interpreting indirect speech, and repairing conversational breakdowns. Traditional interventions include role-play, modeling, self-monitoring, and verbal feedback, though these often show limited generalization to real-life conversations.

Barnes et al. (2019) conducted a conversation-analytic study, observing how an individual with RHD interacts with their spouse and a family friend. In the study, they focused on response-mobilizing acts—turns signaling who should speak next–and how it is impaired in social contexts. Out of 61 such acts, most responses were appropriate according to social norms; however, some showed an insensitivity to interactional cues, such as not following the expected pattern in turn-taking or interpreting social cues correctly, revealing subtle pragmatic deficits that affect everyday conversation. This highlights the importance of examining natural conversation rather than only structured tasks.

Barnes et al. argue that conversation analysis (CA) is useful for highlighting these pragmatic deficits, capturing how real-life conversation differs from normative expectation in ways that structured clinical tasks might miss. They suggest that clinical assessments should include samplings of ordinary, everyday conversations with familiar partners, teaching individuals how to manage response-mobilising acts and repair sequences (moments when conversational problems are signaled and fixed), since these may be especially vulnerable in RHD.

In addition, Minga et al. (2022) studied question-asking in 15 individuals with RHD versus 15 normal controls. They found that RHD participants only produced about half as many questions as their normal controls, particularly fewer polar (yes/no) and content (wh-) questions, suggesting a reduced ability to initiate information-seeking behavior. Reduced question-asking was significantly associated with lower performance in executive function, attention, and visuospatial skills, displaying information-seeking deficits.

They propose the RHD Framework for Asking Questions (R-FAQ), which identifies three stages of conversational questioning:

- Recognizing information needs
- Generating inferences
- Making up explicit questions

Right hemisphere damage may disrupt one or more stages, resulting in fewer or less effective questions during conversation. The disruption of one or more stages can be due to the different types of questions that place more demand on cognitive skills, impacting their ability to ask questions.

The authors recommend using conversational samples, specifically "first-encounter" interactions, to assess question-asking behavior, not just by how much they speak. By focusing on those qualities, clinicians will gain a better sense of pragmatic and cognitive impairments individuals with RHD may have. They propose targeting inferencing, information-need awareness, and explicit question creation in therapy, as well as improving executive function supports that enable effective conversational participation, which can help increase their use of asking questions and cognitive supports to gather more information.

== Cause ==
Stroke is the most common source of damage for a right hemisphere damage. The stroke for this disorder occurs in the right hemisphere of the brain. Other etiologies that cause right hemisphere damage include: trauma (traumatic brain injury), disease, seizures disorders, and infections. Depending on the etiology that causes the right hemisphere damage, different deficits can be accounted for. "The level of deficit or disorder an individual with right hemisphere damage displays depends on the location and extent of the damage. A small focal right hemisphere stroke can produce a very specific deficit and leave most other cognitive and perceptual processes intact, whereas a very large stroke in the right hemisphere more than likely results in multiple profound deficits." Adults with right hemisphere damage may exhibit behavior that can be characterized by insensitivity to others and preoccupation with self; unawareness of the social context of conversations; and verbose, rambling and tangential speech.

== Diagnosis ==
Right hemisphere brain damage is diagnosed by a medical professional. Computerized tomography (CT) scans and magnetic resonance imaging (MRI) are often used to determine where the damage occurred and how severe it is (ASHA).

Standardized assessments are used by speech-language pathologists to determine the presence and severity of right hemisphere brain damage. One standardized assessment, the "cookie jar" assessment tool displays the inability of RHD individuals to grasp wholes. RHD patients are presented with an image of a mother daydreaming in her kitchen as her children sneak up behind her and are climbing a rickety stool, trying to get to a cookie jar in the cabinet above. The son is in the middle of the air, falling off the stool, headed for the edge of the countertop, and the sink the mother is presumably working at is overflowing. The idea of this image is that individuals without hemisphere damage will recognize the situation, that of danger, while RHD individuals may focus on the fact the boy was wearing shoes, or that there were cookies. This stroke tool displays the inability of some RHD individuals to see wholes, having their visual processing centered on one or two details. The three most popular standardized assessments include:

- The Mini Inventory of Right Brain Injury - Second Edition (MIRBI-2) - a standardized test that can be used to identify the presence, severity, and identify the patient's strengths and weaknesses.

- The Right Hemisphere Language Battery - Second Edition, (RHLB-2) -a comprehensive test battery for evaluation of right hemisphere-injured adults.

- The Rehabilitation Institute of Chicago Evaluation of Communicative Problems in Right-Hemisphere Dysfunction Revised (RICE-R) -includes nine subtests which include a patient interview and ratings of facial and written expression and severity ratings for each subtest.

Non-standardized tests can also be useful in determining the communicative deficits of adults with right-hemisphere brain damage. Those procedures include tests of: Visual and Spatial Perception, Attention, and Organization, Component Attentional Processes and Visual Organization. [Do the previously listed "tests" need to be capitalized?] Other non-standardized tests that can be used include:

- The Boston Diagnostic Aphasia Exam (BDAE)-Auditory comprehension, oral expression, and reading subtests

- The Revised Token Test

- The Boston Naming Test

- The Word Fluency Test.

== Treatment ==
Treatment for right hemisphere damage is given by speech-language pathologists. There is not much research that has been done regarding the efficacy of treatments for right hemisphere damage. The research that has been done has shown that persons with right hemisphere damage benefit from therapy at both the chronic and acute stages of recovery for language. Research has also shown that treatment given by speech-language pathologists to persons with right hemisphere damage results in improvement in the areas of problem solving, attention, memory, and pragmatics.

Different treatment approaches can be used to treat the different symptoms of right hemisphere damage including neglect, visuospatial awareness, prosody, and pragmatics. Therapy for each person is individualized to their symptoms and severity of impairment. Intervention should focus on the needs of the person in both communication and functional aspects.

Data from the American Speech-Language-Hearing Association (ASHA) indicate that treatment for individuals with right hemisphere damage tends to focus on areas other than communication, including swallowing, memory, and problem solving. Deficits in language expression, language comprehension, and pragmatics are addressed much less frequently (in 22%, 23%, and 5% of individuals, respectively). The lack of research focusing on communication treatment is cited as a possible explanation for these low percentages. Small-scale and pilot studies have been conducted in recent years to fill the identified gaps in the treatment literature. Emerging evidence is discussed below.

=== Prosody ===
Right hemisphere damage can lead to aprosodia—the inability to produce or comprehend emotional prosody of language. Emotional prosody is typically conveyed and interpreted through changes in pitch, rhythm, or loudness (Leon et al., 2005). Right hemisphere damaged patients have the most difficulty then with sentence types that revolve around pitch and inflection. These sentence types include: declarative, as there is a fall in pitch at the end; interrogative, as there is a rise in pitch for a yes/no question and a drop when there is an interrogative pronoun; and imperative sentence types where there is even pitch until a rise of intensity is made at the end of the command. Research thus far has focused primarily on motoric-imitative and cognitive-linguistic approaches to prosody treatment. In a motoric-imitative approach, the client imitates clinician-modeled sentences produced with target emotional prosody. Modeling and cueing is gradually reduced following a six-step hierarchy until the client reaches independent production. In the cognitive-linguistic approach, the client is prompted to produce sentences with the support of cue cards. Cues include the name of the target emotion, the vocal characteristics of the emotional tone, and a picture of a corresponding facial expression. Again, cues are gradually removed as the client progresses toward independent production. Clinical studies of small groups of participants (four participants; 14 participants.) revealed statistically significant gains in the production of emotional prosody following treatment. Additional research is needed to replicate the results of the limited studies that have been conducted thus far, to evaluate the efficacy of additional treatment approaches, and to compare the relative efficacy of different approaches.

=== Outcome ===
It appears as though individuals with right hemisphere damage maintain their real world knowledge and their mental scripts of what the world is like and what to expect from common scenarios, they just can't translate it when they see it. Despite this, right hemisphere damage can lead to deficits in discourse abilities, including difficulty with interpretation of abstract language, making inferences, and understanding nonverbal cues. In particular, individuals with right hemisphere damage struggle with the skilled use of context to interpret and express ideas. A study of five participants with right hemisphere damage found that participants' ability to orally interpret metaphors was statistically significantly improved following a five-week structured training intervention. The training program included five phases focused on facilitating the use of word meanings and semantic associations to increase participants' understanding of metaphors. Another study of three participants found that a contextual stimulation treatment increased participants' ability to efficiently activate distantly associated meanings and to suppress contextually inappropriate meanings. Again, additional research is needed to replicate and extend results, but the emerging literature represents a small step toward evidence-based treatments for right hemisphere damage.

=== Prosody and Cognitive Rehabilitation ===
According to Ferré et al. (2011), recent studies and research emphasize that at least 50%–78% of individuals with right hemisphere damage (RHD) also exhibit deficits in discourse, pragmatics, and lexical semantics, not just prosody. Issues with prosody, as mentioned earlier, include monotonous speech (i.e., reduced pitch variation), a lack of facial expression, and abnormal speech rate. On the receptive side, some individuals with RHD struggle with identifying emotional cues in speech, such as intended emotion or emphasis.

Ferré et al. (2011) propose a structured approach for rehabilitating prosodic deficits in RHD with three main principles:

- Raising awareness: recognizing prosodic deficits, like reviewing recordings of their own speech.
- Hierarchical therapy: simple, structured tasks that slowly move to more complex, naturalistic speech.
- Cognitive adaptation: tailoring tasks to target other cognitive deficits related to attention, memory, or executive function.

Ferré et al. (2011) also emphasize that therapy and rehabilitation should focus on generalization—applying skills from therapy to everyday interactions—by involving communication with familiar partners (family, friends, partners, etc.) in therapy, training them to provide feedback and support, which can boost the transfer of improved prosodic skills into everyday speech. These interventions not only improve prosody deficits in structured tasks but also help patients apply these skills in social scenarios.

The majority of the evidence comes from small or single-case studies and research, providing limited information and pushing for more extensive research to be done. They call for future research to use pre–post assessments, standardize treatment protocols, and systematically examine how improvements to prosodic deficits can be generalized to everyday life.

== Prognosis ==
=== Sex differences ===
Research has indicated that women are more likely to be left hemisphere dominant, and men are more likely to be right hemisphere dominant. Because of this, women recover faster from left hemisphere damage, and men are more likely to recover faster from right hemisphere damage. Men who have suffered a right hemisphere stroke also have significantly better rehabilitation outcomes than men who suffer a left hemisphere stroke. Recovery of functional abilities is often greater in male stroke survivors than females, especially in the area of activities of daily living.

=== Neglect ===
Left neglect is common in patients recovering from right hemisphere damage as the right hemisphere controls the left half of the body. It is thought that the right hemisphere directs attention to stimuli in both the right and left fields and thus when there is a lesion in it, there are deficits in equal side attendance. The presence and severity of neglect has been shown to influence functional outcomes as well as length of rehabilitation after a stroke.

Patients with neglect for peripersonal space (space within reach), are likely to recover most during the first 10 days after a stroke, but further improvements from 6 months to 1 year post onset are unlikely. However, the prognosis for patients with neglect for personal body space or neglect for far space is much better. These types of neglect are more likely to recover completely or almost completely after 6 months post onset. Although there may be some lasting effects of neglect of varying degrees based on the type, many patients with neglect are likely to improve over time (Appelros et al., 2004).

=== Functional outcomes ===
The Functional Independence Measure (FIM) is often used to determine the functional skills a patient has at various times after their brain damage. Research has indicated that patients with more severe neglect are less likely to make functional improvements than patients with less severe neglect based on FIM scores. Additionally, patients with any level of neglect tend to have reduced functional cognitive and communication skills than patients without neglect (Cherney et al., 2001).

=== Rehabilitation ===
Patients with neglect have been shown to need rehabilitation longer than patients who suffered from right hemisphere damage that did not result in neglect. On average, patients with neglect stayed in inpatient rehabilitation facilities one week longer, and this length of stay did not differ for patients with more or less severe neglect (Cherney et al., 2001).

=== Anosognosia ===
Anosognosia is a lack of awareness or understanding of the loss of function caused by the brain injury and is common in individuals who have suffered a right hemisphere stroke. Because patients with anosognosia may be unaware of their deficits, they may be less likely to seek treatment once they are released from the hospital. The lack of proper treatment could lead to higher levels of dependency later on. In order to make functional recovery gains, right hemisphere stroke survivors should receive rehabilitation services, so patients with anosognosia should be encouraged to seek out additional treatment. However, due to the anosognosia, these patients often report a higher perceived quality of life than other right hemisphere stroke survivors because of the unawareness of the resulting deficits (Daia et al., 2014). Those with right hemisphere damage may confabulate, or make up stories to help explain what is going on in their minds compared to what is actually occurring in the outside world. For example, one patient who had right hemisphere damage was in a wheelchair and kept putting his left hand in the spokes. When the nurse asked him to stop, he looked down and said, "that's not my hand." Since the right hemisphere controls motor functioning for the left side of the body, the patient did not recognize the actions of his own hand and made up a story to explain what was going on. This often occurs because what is actually happening to them is deeply disturbing so their minds need a way to cope. Patients with smaller lesions often recover faster from anosognosia than patients with larger lesions resulting in anosognosia (Hier et al., 1983).

=== Other influences ===
Age: Younger patients typically recover faster than older patients, especially with regards to prosopagnosia (difficulty recognizing faces). Younger patients, under the age of 25, have a much better prognosis, as their brains are still undergoing development. One function that is thought to develop particularly late is temporal integrative functions. Meaning that young patients with right hemisphere strokes can integrate events over time, working around their inflexibility in the present moment.

Size of lesion: Patients with smaller lesions typically recover faster from neglect and hemiparesis (unilateral body weakness) than patients with larger lesions (Hier et al., 1983).

== History ==
For the majority of the nineteenth century, the left brain hemisphere was the key focus of clinical research on language disorders (Brookshire, 2007). In the twentieth century, focus gradually shifted to include right hemisphere damage (Brookshire, 2007). It is now well established that language and cognition can be seriously impaired by unilateral right hemisphere brain damage. Specific cognitive tests can help diagnose the existence of right hemisphere brain damage and differentiate symptoms from those of left hemisphere damage. Unlike the aphasias, caused by left hemisphere damage and generally resulting in focused language deficits, right hemisphere brain damage can result in a variety of diffuse deficits which complicate formal testing of this disorder (Brookshire, 2007). These formal tests assess areas such as understanding humor, metaphors, sarcasm, facial expression, and prosody. However, not all individuals with right hemisphere brain damage have problems in language or communication and some may have no discernible symptoms. Indeed, about half of patients with right hemisphere damage have intact communication abilities (Brookshire, 2007).

== See also ==
- Agnosia
- Aphasia
