= Train of thought =

Sequence of connected ideas to be expressed

The train of thought, or occasionally, chain of thought refers to the interconnection in the sequence of ideas expressed during a connected discourse or thought, as well as the sequence itself, especially in discussion of how this sequence leads from one idea to another. This construct relates the stringing together of ideas to the way train cars are connected on a track.

When a reader or listener "loses the train of thought" (i.e., loses the relation between consecutive sentences or phrases, or the relation between non-verbal concepts in an argument or presentation), comprehension is lost of the expressed or unexpressed thought.

== Origins ==
The term "train of thoughts" was introduced and elaborated as early as in 1651 by Thomas Hobbes in his Leviathan, though with a somewhat different meaning (similar to the meaning used by the British associationists):

By Consequence, or train of thoughts, I understand that succession of one thought to another which is called, to distinguish it from discourse in words, mental discourse.
When a man thinketh on anything whatsoever, his next thought after is not altogether so casual as it seems to be. Not every thought to every thought succeeds indifferently.

— Thomas Hobbes, Leviathan, The First Part: Of Man, Chapter III: Of the Consequence or Train of Imagination

== See also ==
- Absent-mindedness
- Association of Ideas
- Associationism
- Derailment (thought disorder)
- Internal monologue
- Mind-wandering
- Stream of consciousness
