= Stilted speech =

Unusually formal speech

In psychiatry, stilted speech or pedantic speech is communication characterized by situationally inappropriate formality. This formality can be expressed both through abnormal prosody as well as speech content that is "inappropriately pompous, legalistic, philosophical, or quaint". Often, such speech can act as evidence for autism spectrum disorders (ASD) or a thought disorder, a common symptom in schizophrenia or schizoid personality disorder.

To diagnose stilted speech, researchers have previously looked for the following characteristics:

- Speech conveying more information than necessary
- Vocabulary and grammar expected from formal writing rather than conversational speech
- Unnecessary repetition or corrections

While literal and long-winded word content is often the most identifiable feature of stilted speech, such speech often displays irregular prosody, especially in resonance. Often, the loudness, pitch, rate, and nasality of pedantic speech vary from normal speech, resulting in the perception of pedantic or stilted speaking. For example, overly loud or high-pitched speech can come across to listeners as overly forceful while slow or nasal speech creates an impression of condescension.

These attributions, which are commonly found in patients with autism, partially account for why stilted speech has been considered a diagnostic criterion for autism. Stilted speech, along with atypical intonation, semantic drift, terseness, and perseveration, are all known deficits with children and adolescents on the autism spectrum. Often, stilted speech found in children with autism will also be especially stereotypic or in some cases even rehearsed.

Patients with schizophrenia are also known to have stilted speech. This symptom is attributed to both an inability to access more commonly used words and a difficulty understanding pragmatics – the relationship between language and context. However, stilted speech is as a less common symptom than certain others. Stilted speech is also exhibited as a symptom in the narcissistic personality disorder.

== See also ==
- Communication deviance
- Infodumping
- Literary language
- Otaku § Etymology
- Register (sociolinguistics)
