= Brief Psychiatric Rating Scale =

Psychiatric symptom rating scale

The Brief Psychiatric Rating Scale (BPRS) is a rating scale which a clinician or researcher may use to measure psychiatric symptoms such as depression, anxiety, hallucinations and unusual behaviour. The scale is one of the oldest, most widely used scales to measure psychotic symptoms and was first published in 1962.

== History ==
The BPRS was initially developed by John E. Overall and Donald R. Gorham. It was created for the purpose of being able to quickly assess the patient’s psychiatric symptoms prior, during, or following a treatment. The items of the test were generated from conducting factor analysis on the Multidimensional Scale for Rating Psychiatric Patients and the Inpatient Multidimensional Psychiatric Scale. Sixteen factors were found from the analysis, which served as the building blocks for the BPRS. Later research in 1968 added two more factors to the BPRS, which were excitement and disorientation.

== Test format ==
The BPRS consists of 18 items measuring the following factors:

- anxiety
- emotional withdrawal
- conceptual disorganization
- guilt feelings
- tension
- mannerisms and posturing
- grandiosity
- depressive moods
- hostility
- suspiciousness
- hallucinatory behavior
- motor hyperactivity
- uncooperativeness
- unusual thought content
- blunted affect
- somatic concern
- excitement
- disorientation

It uses a seven-item Likert scale with the following values:

- 1 = not present
- 2 = very mild
- 3 = mild
- 4 = moderate
- 5 = moderately severe
- 6 = severe
- 7 = extremely severe

The test is administered in tandem with a series of interviews conducted by at least two clinicians to ensure inter-rater reliability of the assessment.

== Usage ==
The BPRS is intended for use on adult psychiatric patients and has been validated for use in elderly populations. A version designed for children called the Brief Psychiatric Rating Scale Children was also developed by Overall and Betty Pfefferbaum, with different scale structures and factors.

== Further development ==
An expanded version of the test was created in 1993 by D. Lukoff, Keith H. Nuechterlein, and Joseph Ventura.

== See also ==
- Diagnostic classification and rating scales used in psychiatry
- Positive and Negative Syndrome Scale (PANSS)
- Scale for the Assessment of Negative Symptoms (SANS)
- Scale for the Assessment of Positive Symptoms (SAPS)
