= Infodumping =

Excessive information sharing

Infodumping is the supplying of a large (and often excessive) amount of information, all at once. The term was first used in 1978 in the Proceedings of the Southeastcon Region 3 Conference 353. Over time, the term "infodumping" was adopted in the context of literature (particularly within fantasy and science fiction) as well as by the autistic community.

== Infodumping in literature ==
In a literary context, infodumping is when an author writes execessive chunks of exposition, particularly if they are dull or irrelevant to the narrative. This can result in dry, unengaging prose. It is often discussed among science fiction and fantasy authors because both subgenres require worldbuilding, which can be challenging for authors to weave in naturally with the plot.

The narrative technique "show, don't tell" can help authors reduce literary infodumping, as it encourages the use of actions, words, subtext, thoughts, senses, and feelings instead of exposition.

== Infodumping as a neurodivergent communication style ==
"Infodumping" is understood as one element of autistic expression, particularly as it relates to their topics of interest. Among autistic people, infodumping plays a social role in bonding as it is a way of sharing interests. Autistic people are more likely to welcome infodumping and view it as a positive trait in others than their non-autistic peers.

Because non-autistic people are more likely to view infodumping as a negative trait, autistic people may feel pressured to "mask" their intense interest in a subject. They may tone down their level of excitement or avoid talking about a subject altogether if they suspect their conversation partner does not want to hear their infodump. Talk therapy can be a beneficial place for autistic individuals to "info dump everything" going on in their lives without fear of negative judgement.

Infodumping is also associated with attention deficit hyperactivity disorder.

== See also ==
- Communication deviance
- Double empathy problem
- Societal and cultural aspects of autism
- Stilted speech
- Exposition (narrative)
