= Positive and Negative Syndrome Scale =

Scale for assessing schizophrenia

- Purpose: measures severity of individuals with schizophrenia

The Positive and Negative Syndrome Scale (PANSS) is a medical scale used for measuring symptom severity of patients with schizophrenia. It was published in 1987 by Stanley Kay, Lewis Opler, and Abraham Fiszbein. It is widely used in the study of antipsychotic therapy. The scale is the "gold standard" for evaluating the effects of psychopharmacological treatments.

The name refers to the two types of symptoms in schizophrenia, as defined by the American Psychiatric Association: positive symptoms, which refer to an excess or distortion of normal functions (e.g., hallucinations and delusions), and negative symptoms, which represent a diminution or loss of normal functions. Some of these functions which may be lost include normal thoughts, actions, ability to tell fantasies from reality, and the ability to properly express emotions.

The PANSS is a relatively brief interview, requiring 45 to 50 minutes to administer. The interviewer must be trained to a standardized level of reliability.

== Interview items ==
To assess a patient using PANSS, an approximately 45-minute clinical interview is conducted. The patient is rated from 1 to 7 on 30 different symptoms based on the interview as well as reports of family members or primary care hospital workers.

=== Positive scale ===
7 Items, (minimum score = 7, maximum score = 49)

- Delusions
- Conceptual disorganization
- Hallucinations
- Excitement
- Grandiosity
- Suspiciousness/persecution
- Hostility

=== Negative scale ===
7 Items, (minimum score = 7, maximum score = 49)

- Blunted affect
- Emotional withdrawal
- Poor rapport
- Passive/apathetic social withdrawal
- Difficulty in abstract thinking
- Lack of spontaneity and flow of conversation
- Stereotyped thinking

=== General Psychopathology scale ===
16 Items, (minimum score = 16, maximum score = 112)

- Somatic concern
- Anxiety
- Guilt feelings
- Tension
- Mannerisms and posturing
- Depression
- Motor retardation
- Uncooperativeness
- Unusual thought content
- Disorientation
- Poor attention
- Lack of judgment and insight
- Disturbance of volition
- Poor impulse control
- Preoccupation
- Active social avoidance

PANSS Total score minimum = 30, maximum = 210

== Scoring ==
As 1 rather than 0 is given as the lowest score for each item, a patient cannot score lower than 30. Scores are often given separately for the positive items, negative items, and general psychopathology. In their original publication on the PANSS scale, Stanley Kay and colleagues tested the scale on 101 adult patients (20-68 years-old) with schizophrenia and the mean scores were

- Positive scale = 18.20
- Negative scale = 21.01
- General psychopathology = 37.74

Based on meta-analytic results, an alternative five-factor solution of the PANSS was proposed with positive symptoms, negative symptoms, disorganization, excitement, and emotional distress.

== See also ==
- Brief Psychiatric Rating Scale (BPRS)
- Diagnostic classification and rating scales used in psychiatry
- Scale for the Assessment of Negative Symptoms (SANS)
- Scale for the Assessment of Positive Symptoms (SAPS)
