= Circumstantial speech =

Seemingly tangential discussion that returns to the point

Circumstantial speech, also referred to as circumstantiality, is a form of disorganized speech wherein apparently unnecessary details and seemingly irrelevant remarks cause a delay in getting to the point. It is the result of a so-called "non-linear thought pattern" and occurs when the focus of a conversation drifts, but often comes back to the point.

If someone exhibits circumstantial speech during a conversation, they will often seem to "talk the long way around" to their point, which may be an attempt by the speaker to include pertinent details, that may contrast with the speech which is more direct, succinct, and to the point (the gist) even at the expense of more precise, accurate communication. Circumstantial speech is more direct than tangential speech in which the speaker wanders and drifts and usually never returns to the original topic, and is far less severe than logorrhea. It is also distinct from flight of ideas, which is less organized and can appear nonsensical or as word salad.

Circumstantial speech can cause difficulty in healthcare situations where providers struggle to understand a patient's answer to clinical questions.

Treatment is generally based on the underlying cause, such as a psychotic or neurological disorder.

== Causes ==
Circumstantial speech, as a form of disorganized speech, can be a symptom of psychotic disorders like schizophrenia, schizophreniform disorder, schizoaffective disorder, and brief psychotic disorder. It can also be a part of mood disorders that include thought disturbances of psychotic features, like some forms of bipolar I disorder.

Circumstantial speech can also be seen in individuals with obsessive–compulsive disorder when compulsive thoughts lead them to feel obligated to include an unnecessary level of detail in speech, as well as in individuals with attention deficit hyperactivity disorder due to differences in executive functioning and conversational filtering.

Those with some specific personality disorders, particularly schizotypal personality disorder and narcissistic personality disorder, may present with circumstantial speech.

Similar speech patterns can also occur in individuals with intellectual disability, some kinds of epilepsy, neurocognitive disorders such as dementia, and Ganser syndrome.

== See also ==
- Aphasia
- Agnosia
- Auditory processing disorder
- Verbosity
