= Pressure of speech =

- Specialty: Psychiatry, clinical psychology

Pressure of speech (or pressured speech) is a type of speech characterized by being fast and frenetic (i.e., mainly without pauses), including some irregularities in loudness and rhythm or some degrees of circumstantiality; it is hard to interpret and expresses a feeling/affect of emergency. It is mainly a neuropsychological symptom of specific mental disorders, such as bipolar disorders, thought disorders, and stress-related disorders among others.

== Description ==
Pressured speech is unrelenting, rapid, often loud talking without pauses. Those with pressured speech do not respond to verbal and nonverbal cues indicating that others wish to speak, turning from one listener to another or speaking even when no listeners remain.

== Causes ==
=== As a symptom of mental disorder ===
Pressure of speech mainly happens in the bipolar disorders, during the hypomanic and manic episodes. It also happens because of acute or chronic over-stress in post-traumatic stress disorder (PTSD). Thought disorders' symptoms like flight of ideas can induce pressured speech, with some degrees of circumstantiality or tangential speech. It is also a direct or indirect symptom of anxiety disorders, attention deficit hyperactivity disorder (ADHD), autism spectrum disorder, and schizophrenia.

=== Stimulants ===
Stimulants such as cocaine or amphetamines may cause speech resembling pressured speech in individuals with pre-existing psychopathology and produce hypomanic or manic symptoms in general, owing both to the substance's own qualities and the underlying nature of an individual's psyche. In many psychotic disorders, use of certain drugs amplifies certain expressions of symptoms, and stimulant-induced pressured speech is among them.

== Effects ==
Pressured speech may lead to stuttering, e.g., a person's want to express themselves is faster than their ability to utter their thoughts.

== Related conditions ==
- Cluttering is a speech disorder that is related to pressure of speech in that the speech of a clutterer sounds improperly verbalized. However, cluttering is a distinct language disorder. Even though cluttering sounds almost identical to pressure of speech, it differs in that pressure of speech is rooted in anxiety, where cluttering is not.
- Pressure of speech is an instance of tachylalia, or rapid speech. Pressure of speech is also variously related to agitolalia, agitophasia, tachyphasia, and verbomania.
- Circumstantial speech is a communication disorder in which the focus of a conversation drifts. In circumstantiality, unnecessary details and irrelevant remarks cause a delay in getting to the point.

== See also ==
- Aphasia
- Auditory processing disorder
- Logorrhea
