= Thought blocking =

Neuropsychological symptom

In psychiatry and neuropsychology, thought blocking is a sudden and involuntary silence during a person's speech, followed by an abrupt switch to another topic. Persons undergoing thought blocking may utter incomprehensible speech; they may also repeat words involuntarily or make up new words (neologism). As a symptom, thought blocking is indicative of an underlying mental disorder, such as schizophrenia, anxiety disorders, petit mal seizures, post-traumatic stress disorder, dissociative identity disorder, bradyphrenia, aphasia, dementia and delirium.

== Schizophrenia ==
Thought blocking occurs most often in people with psychiatric illnesses, most commonly schizophrenia. A person's speech is suddenly interrupted by silences that may last a few seconds to a minute or longer. When the person begins speaking again, after the block, they will often speak about an unrelated subject. Blocking is also described as an experience of unanticipated, quick and total emptying of the mind. When evaluating a patient for schizophrenia, a physician may look for thought blocking. People with schizophrenia commonly experience thought blocking and may interpret the experience in peculiar ways. For example, a person with schizophrenia might remark that another person has removed their thoughts from their brain.

== Anxiety disorders ==
Generalized anxiety disorder (GAD) is defined as excessive worry about matters in two or more separate subjects for at least six months. When a person experiences an anxiety attack, they may become so hyperfocused on the distressing stimuli or overwhelmed with the situation that regular speech is difficult for that person to produce. The thought blocking that occurs in this instance is usually short lived because anxiety attacks are transient. After an episode occurs, a person is typically able to resume their normal way of speaking.

== Seizures ==
Thought blocking is associated with absence seizures. As such, it can be hard for people to organize their speech, resulting in thought blocking.

== Post-traumatic stress disorder ==
Post-traumatic stress disorder (PTSD) is a psychiatric disorder that can occur after a person experiences a traumatic event and is significantly handicapped because of it, and can develop inappropriate coping strategies. These maladaptive approaches can include, but are not limited to dissociation, especially depersonalization and derealization. When these dissociative symptoms surface, they can be extremely intrusive and result in a person not being able to focus on their diction, or manner of speaking, and result in thought blocking. People with PTSD may find that blocking of thought occurs more often if they have not addressed the source of their PTSD.

== Cognitive and motor disorders ==
In older adults, blocking of thought can be a feature of several cognitive and motor disorders, including underlying dementia and delirium. It is common that as a person ages, they may become forgetful and/or lose their train of thought. When it becomes more persistent and affects one's ability to carry out their ADLs (activities of daily living), a major neurocognitive disorder like dementia is among the possible causes. In addition, thought blocking can occur in patients with parkinsonism, a disorder that features slowing of movement, muscle rigidity, and impairment. The distinguishing feature between parkinsonism and Parkinson's disease is that the causes of parkinsonism are numerous, including drugs, toxins, metabolic disorders, and head trauma. Furthermore, a stroke can result in a disordered speech process such as thought blocking. When a stroke affects the middle cerebral artery (MCA), it can result in damage to the Wernicke's area or Broca's area. As such, people afflicted can understand speech well but have problems saying the words they want to, or be able to speak but have nonsensical syntax and word choice. These symptoms are referred to as aphasias, and aphasias can present with thought blocking.
