= Alogia =

Poor thinking inferred from speech and language usage

In psychology, alogia (/ˌeɪˈloʊdʒiə, əˈloʊdʒiə, əˈlɒdʒiə, -dʒə/; from Greek ἀ-, 'without', and λόγος, 'speech' + New Latin -ia) is poor thinking inferred from speech and language usage. There may be a general lack of additional, unprompted content seen in normal speech, so replies to questions may be brief and concrete, with less spontaneous speech. This is termed poverty of speech or laconic speech. The amount of speech may be normal but conveys little information because it is vague, empty, stereotyped, overconcrete, overabstract, or repetitive. This is termed poverty of content or poverty of content of speech. Under Scale for the Assessment of Negative Symptoms used in clinical research, thought blocking is considered a part of alogia, and so is increased latency in response.

This condition is associated with schizophrenia, dementia, severe depression, and autism. As a symptom, it is commonly seen in patients with schizophrenia and schizotypal personality disorder, and is traditionally considered a negative symptom. It can complicate psychotherapy severely because of the considerable difficulty in holding a fluent conversation.

The alternative meaning of alogia is inability to speak because of dysfunction in the central nervous system, found in mental deficiency and dementia. In this sense, the word is synonymous with aphasia, and in less severe form, it is sometimes called dyslogia.

== Characteristics ==
Alogia may be on a continuum with normal behaviors. People without mental illness may have it occasionally including when fatigued or disinhibited, when writers use language creatively, and when people in certain disciplines—such as politicians, administrators, philosophers, ministers, and scientists—use language pedantically. Hence, deciding if an individual has alogia depends on contextual clues. Is the person in control? Can the person moderate the effect if asked to be specific or concise? Is it better with another topic? Are there other significant symptoms?

Alogia is characterized by a lack of speech, often caused by a disruption in the thought process. Usually, an injury to the brain may cause alogia to appear in an individual. While in conversation, alogic patients will reply very sparsely and their answers to questions will lack spontaneous content; sometimes, they will even fail to answer at all. Their responses will be brief, generally only appearing as a response to a question or prompt.

Studies have shown a correlation between alogic ratings in individuals and the amount and duration of pauses in their speech when responding to a series of questions posed by the researcher. The inability to speak stems from a deeper mental inability that causes alogic patients to have difficulty grasping the right words mentally, as well as formulating their thoughts. A study investigating alogiacs and their results on the category fluency task showed that people with schizophrenia who exhibit alogia display a more disorganized semantic memory than controls. While both groups produced the same number of words, the words produced by people with schizophrenia were much more disorderly and the results of cluster analysis revealed bizarre coherence in the alogiac group.

If the condition is assessed using a language other than the individual's primary language, the medical professional needs to make sure that the problem is not from language barriers.

== Example ==
The following table shows an example of "poverty of speech" in the first column, where spontaneous speech is minimized and answers to questions are brief and concrete.

Example of "poverty of speech"
Poverty of speech

Q: Do you have any children?
A: Yes.
Q: How many?
A: Two.
Q: How old are they?
A: Six and sixteen.
Q: Are they boys or girls?
A: One of each.
Q: Who is the sixteen-year-old?
A: The boy.
Q: What is his name?
A: Edmond.
Q: And the girl's?
A: Alice.

Normal speech

Q: Do you have any children?
A: Yes, a boy and a girl.
Q: How old are they?
A: Edmond is sixteen and Alice is six.

The following example of "poverty of content of speech" is a response from a patient when asked why he was in a hospital. Speech is vague, conveys little information, but is not grossly incoherent and the amount of speech is not reduced. "I often contemplate—it is a general stance of the world—it is a tendency which varies from time to time—it defines things more than others—it is in the nature of habit—this is what I would like to say to explain everything."

== Causes ==
Alogia can be brought on by frontostriatal dysfunction, which causes degradation of the semantic store, the center located in the temporal lobe that processes meaning in language. A subgroup of chronic schizophrenia patients in a word generation experiment generated fewer words than the unaffected subjects and had limited lexicons, evidence of the weakening of the semantic store. Another study found that when given the task of naming items in a category, schizophrenia patients displayed a great struggle but improved significantly when experimenters employed a second stimulus to guide behavior unconsciously. This conclusion was similar to results produced from patients with Huntington's and Parkinson's disease, ailments which also involve frontostriatal dysfunction.

== Treatment ==
Medical studies conclude that certain adjunctive drugs effectively palliate the negative symptoms of schizophrenia, mainly alogia. In one study, Maprotiline produced the greatest reduction in alogia symptoms with severity reduction in 50% of patients (out of 10). Of the negative symptoms of schizophrenia, alogia had the second best responsiveness to the drugs, surpassed only by attention deficiency. D-amphetamine is another drug that has been tested on people with schizophrenia and found success in alleviating negative symptoms. This treatment, however, has not been developed greatly as it seems to have adverse effects on other aspects of schizophrenia such as increasing the severity of positive symptoms.

== Relation to schizophrenia ==
Although alogia is found as a symptom in a variety of health disorders, it is most commonly found as a negative symptom of schizophrenia.

Previous studies and analyses conclude that at least three factors are needed to cover both the positive and negative symptoms of schizophrenia; the three are: psychotic, disorganization, and negative symptom factors. Studies suggest that an inappropriate affect is strongly associated with bizarre behavior and positive formal thought disorder on a disorganization factor; attention impairment correlates significantly with psychotic, disorganization, and negative symptom factors. Alogia contains both positive and negative symptoms, with the poverty of content of speech as the disorganization factor, and poverty of speech, response latency, and thought blocking as the negative symptom factors.

Alogia is a major diagnostic sign of schizophrenia, when organic mental disorders have been excluded.

In schizophrenia, negative symptoms including flattening of affect, avolition, and alogia are responsible for the considerable morbidity of the disease compared with other psychotic disorders. Negative symptoms are common in the prodromal and residual phases of the disease and can be severe. During the first year, negative symptoms can progress, especially alogia, which may start off from a relatively low rate. Within two years, up to 25% of patients will have significant negative symptoms. Psychotic symptoms tend to diminish as the individuals age, but negative symptoms tend to persist. Prominent negative symptoms at disease onset, including alogia, are good predictors of worse outcomes.

Negative symptoms can arise in the presence of other psychiatric symptoms. Positive symptoms are a common cause of apathy, social withdrawal, and alogia. Secondary causes of negative symptoms, such as depression and demoralization, often remit within a year, which helps distinguishing them from primary negative symptoms. Symptoms that don't diminish over a year with medications should be reconsidered as possible primary negative symptoms.

== See also ==
- Aphasia
- Communication deviance
- List of language disorders
- Mutism
