= Tangential speech =

Communication disorder

Tangential speech or tangentiality is a communication disorder in which the train of thought of the speaker wanders and shows a lack of focus, never returning to the initial topic of the conversation. It commonly occurs in situations where an individual experiences high anxiety, as a manifestation of acute psychosis, dementia, or states of delirium. It is less severe than logorrhea and may be associated with the middle stage in dementia. It is, however, more severe than circumstantial speech, in which the speaker wanders but eventually returns to the topic.

Some adults with right hemisphere brain damage exhibit tangential speech. Those who exhibit tangential speech may also have related symptoms, such as seemingly inappropriate, self-centered social responses and deteriorations in conversation capabilities (including maintaining appropriate eye contact and staying on topic).

== Definition ==
The term refers simplistically to a thought disorder shown from speech with a lack of observance to the main subject of discourse, such that a person whilst speaking on a topic deviates from the topic. Further definition is of speech that deviates from an answer to a question that is relevant in the first instance but deviates from the relevancy to related subjects not involved in a direct answering of the question. In the context of a conversation or discussion the communication is a response that is ineffective in that the form is inappropriate for adequate understanding. The person's speech seems to indicate that their attention to their own speech has perhaps in some way been overcome during the occurrence of cognition whilst speaking, causing the vocalized content to follow thought that is apparently without reference to the original idea or question; or the person's speech is considered evasive in that the person has decided to provide an answer to a question that is an avoidance of a direct answer.

== History ==
The earlier phenomenological description (Schneider et al. 1930) allowed for further definition on the basis of formal characteristic rather than content, producing later practice relying upon clinical assessment (Andreasen 1979). The term has undergone a redefinition to refer only to a person's speech in response to a question, and to provide the definition separation from the similar symptoms loosening of association and derailment (Andreasen 1979).

== Other ==
According to the St. Louis system for the diagnosis of schizophrenia, tangentiality is significantly associated with a low IQ prior to diagnosis (AU Parnas et al 2007).

== See also ==
- Aphasia
- Circumstantial speech
- Theories of communication
- Harold Lasswell
