= Nancy Coover Andreasen =

American neuroscientist

- Born: November 11, 1938 (age 87); Lincoln, Nebraska
- Awards: National Medal of Science
- Scientific career
- Fields: Neuroscience, Neuropsychiatry

Nancy Coover Andreasen (born November 11, 1938) is an American neuroscientist and neuropsychiatrist. She currently holds the Andrew H. Woods Chair of Psychiatry at the Roy J. and Lucille A. Carver College of Medicine at the University of Iowa.

== Early life ==
Andreasen was born in Lincoln, Nebraska. She received her undergraduate degree from the University of Nebraska with majors in English, History, and Philosophy. She received a Ph.D. in English literature. She was a Professor of Renaissance Literature in the Department of English at the University of Iowa for 5 years. She published scholarly articles on John Donne and her first book in the field of Renaissance English literature: John Donne: Conservative Revolutionary.

== Clinical ==
A serious illness after the birth of her first daughter piqued Andreasen's interest in medicine and biomedical research, and she decided to change careers to study medicine. She attended medical school at the University of Iowa College of Medicine, graduated in 1970 and completed her psychiatry residency in 1973. In 1974, she conducted the first modern empirical study of creativity that recognized some association between creativity and manic-depressive illness.

Early in her career she recognized that negative symptoms and associated cognitive impairments had more debilitating effects than psychotic symptoms, like delusions and hallucinations. While psychotic symptoms represent an exaggeration of normal brain/mind functions, negative symptoms represent a loss of normal functions, for example, alogia, the loss of the ability to think and speak fluently; affective blunting, the loss of the ability to express emotions; avolition, loss of the ability to initiate goal-directed activity; and anhedonia, loss of the ability to experience emotions. The papers describing these concepts have become citation classics, as determined by the Science Citation Index produced by the Institute for Scientific Information. Andreasen is largely responsible for development of the concept of negative symptoms in schizophrenia, having created the first widely used scales for rating the positive and negative symptoms of schizophrenia. She became one of the world's foremost authorities on schizophrenia. She contributed to nosology and phenomenology by serving on the DSM III and DSM IV Task Forces, chairing the Schizophrenia Work Group for DSM IV.

Andreasen pioneered the application of neuroimaging techniques in major mental illnesses, and published the first quantitative study of magnetic resonance imaging of brain abnormalities in schizophrenia. Andreasen became director of the Iowa Mental Health Clinical Research Center and the Psychiatric Iowa Neuroimaging Consortium. She leads a multidisciplinary team working on three-dimensional image analysis techniques to integrate multi-modality imaging and on developing automated analysis of structural and functional imaging techniques. Software developed by this team is known as BRAINS (Brain Research: Analysis of Images, Networks, and Systems).

She resumed research about the neuroscience of creativity in the 2000s.

== Honors ==
In 2000 President Clinton awarded her the National Medal of Science, America's highest award for scientific achievement. This award was given for

her pivotal contributions to the social and behavioral sciences, through the integrative study of mind, brain, and behavior, by joining behavioral science with the technologies of neuroscience and neuroimaging in order to understand mental processes such as memory and creativity, and mental illnesses such as schizophrenia.

She has received numerous other awards, including the Interbrew-Baillet-Latour Prize from the Belgian Academy of Science, the Lieber Schizophrenia Research Prize, and many awards from the American Psychiatric Association, including its Research Prize, the Judd Marmor Award, and the Distinguished Service Award. She was elected a Fellow of the American Academy of Arts and Sciences in 2002. She is a member of the National Academy of Medicine (formerly the Institute of Medicine of the National Academy of Sciences. She was elected to serve two terms on the governing council of the latter organization. She chaired two Institute of Medicine/National Academy of Sciences Committees that published influential reports. She served as Editor-in-Chief of the American Journal of Psychiatry for 13 years. She is past president of the American Psychopathological Association and the Psychiatric Research Society. She was the founding Chair of the Neuroscience Section of the American Association for the Advancement of Science. She is a member of the Society for Neuroscience and on the Honorary International Editorial Advisory Board of the Mens Sana Monographs.

== Experience of sexism ==
She has spoken about her experiences of sexism. Early in her career she found that her articles were more likely to be accepted for publication when she used her initials instead of her first name.

== Personal life ==
She is the mother of two daughters. Suz Andreasen, who was a jewelry designer who lived in New York City, died from ovarian cancer on November 10, 2010. Robin Andreasen is a professor of Cognitive Science at the University of Delaware. She is married to Captain Terry Gwinn, a retired military officer who flew helicopter gunships for 3.5 tours during the Vietnam War.

== Selected bibliography ==
She wrote three books for the general public:

- "The Broken Brain: The Biological Revolution in Psychiatry" (1983),
- "Brave New Brain: Conquering Mental Illness in the Era of the Genome" (2001),
- "The Creating Brain: The Neuroscience of Genius".

She authored, co-authored, or edited twelve other scholarly books and over 600 articles.

- John Donne: Conservative Revolutionary. 1967
- Introductory Textbook of Psychiatry, Fourth Edition by Nancy C. Andreasen and Donald W. Black
- Understanding mental illness: A layman's guide (Religion and medicine series)
- Schizophrenia: From Mind to Molecule (American Psychopathological Association)
- Brain Imaging: Applications in Psychiatry
