= Word salad =

Confused unintelligible jumble of words and phrases

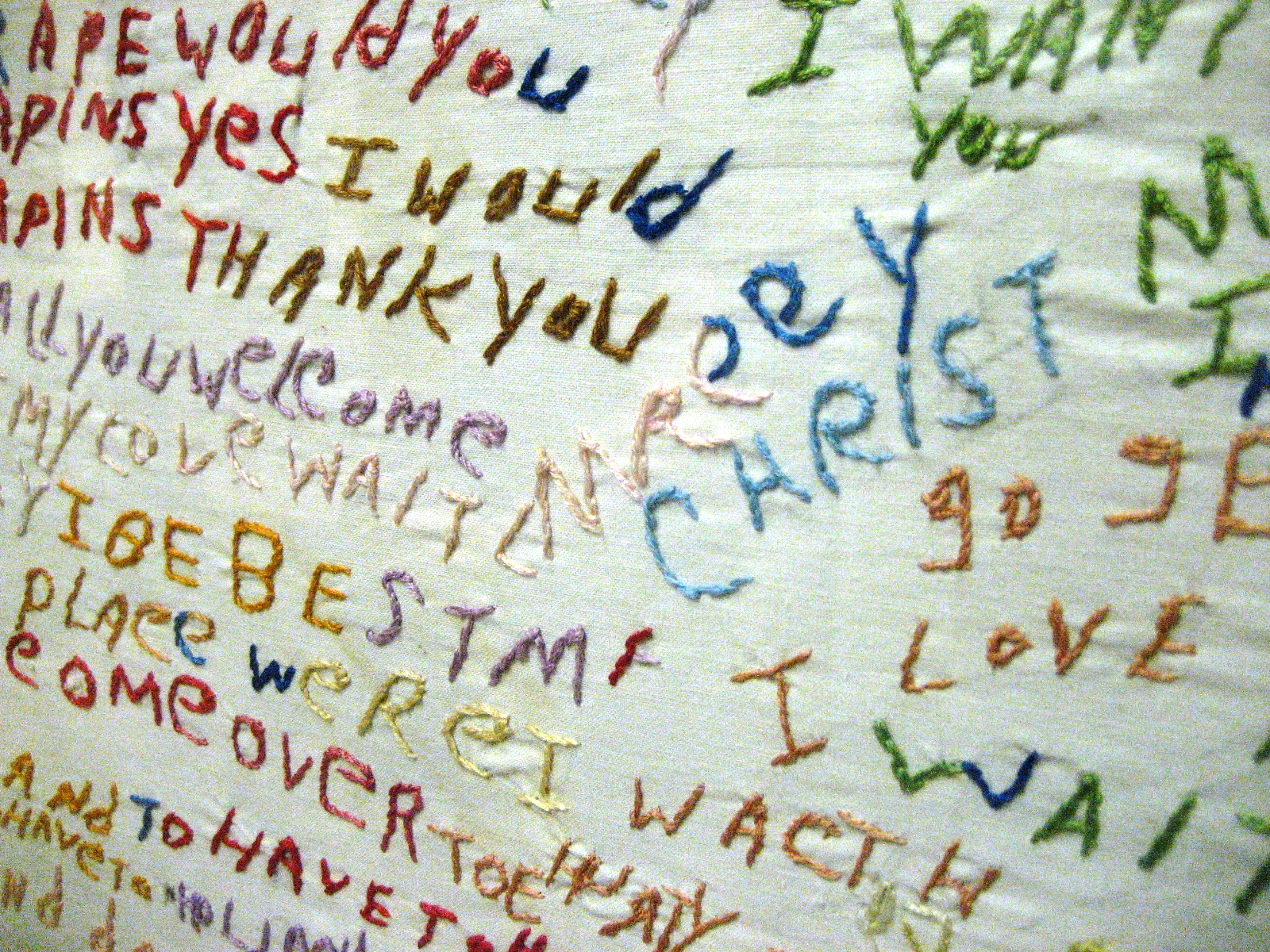
Textile art by a person with schizophrenia, embroidering seemingly unconnected words onto fabric: a word salad.

A word salad is a "confused or unintelligible mixture of seemingly random words and phrases", often used in psychiatry to describe a symptom of a neurological or mental disorder. The name schizophasia is used in particular to describe the confused language that may be evident in schizophrenia. The words may or may not be grammatically correct, but they are semantically confused to the point that the listener cannot extract any meaning from them. The term is also used in theoretical linguistics to describe a type of grammatical acceptability judgement by native speakers.

== Psychiatry ==
Word salad may describe a symptom of neurological or psychiatric conditions in which a person attempts to communicate an idea, but words and phrases that may appear to be random and unrelated come out in an incoherent sequence instead. Often, the person is unaware that they did not make sense. It appears in people with dementia and schizophrenia, as well as after anoxic brain injury. In schizophrenia, it is called schizophasia. Clang associations are especially characteristic of mania, as seen in bipolar disorder, as a somewhat more severe variation of flight of ideas. In extreme mania, the patient's speech may become incoherent, with associations markedly loosened, thus presenting as a veritable word salad.

It may be present as:

- Clanging, a speech pattern that follows rhyming and other sound associations rather than meaning
- Graphorrhea, a written version of word salad that is more rarely seen than logorrhea in people with schizophrenia
- Logorrhea, excessive speech that lacks in content, and may be incoherent or compulsive
- Receptive aphasia, fluent in speech but without making sense, often a result of a stroke or other brain injury

== See also ==
- AI slop – Low-quality AI-generated digital content
- Gibberish
- Paragrammatism, inability to produce or create grammatically correct sentences
- Pressure of speech
- Thought disorder
- Literary nonsense
