= Period 2 element =

Any of the chemical elements in the second row of the periodic table

A period 2 element is one of the chemical elements in the second row (or period) of the periodic table of the chemical elements. The periodic table is laid out in rows to illustrate recurring (periodic) trends in the chemical behavior of the elements as their atomic number increases; a new row is started when chemical behavior begins to repeat, creating columns of elements with similar properties.

The second period contains the elements lithium, beryllium, boron, carbon, nitrogen, oxygen, fluorine, and neon. In a quantum mechanical description of atomic structure, this period corresponds to the filling of the second (n = 2) shell, more specifically its 2s and 2p subshells. Period 2 elements (carbon, nitrogen, oxygen, fluorine and neon) obey the octet rule in that they need eight electrons to complete their valence shell (lithium and beryllium obey duet rule, boron is electron deficient.), where at most eight electrons can be accommodated: two in the 2s orbital and six in the 2p subshell.

== Periodic trends ==
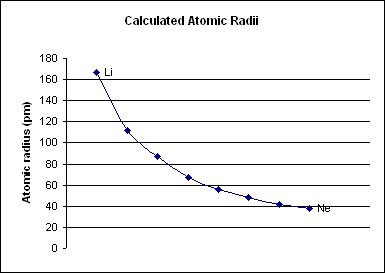
Calculated atomic radii of period 2 elements in picometers.

Period 2 is the first period in the periodic table from which periodic trends can be drawn. Period 1, which only contains two elements (hydrogen and helium), is too small to draw any conclusive trends from it, especially because the two elements behave nothing like other s-block elements. Period 2 has much more conclusive trends. For all elements in period 2, as the atomic number increases, the atomic radius of the elements decreases, the electronegativity increases, and the ionization energy increases.

Period 2 only has two metals (lithium and beryllium) of eight elements, less than for any subsequent period both by number and by proportion. It also has the most number of nonmetals, namely five, among all periods. The elements in period 2 often have the most extreme properties in their respective groups; for example, fluorine is the most reactive halogen, neon is the most inert noble gas, and lithium is the least reactive alkali metal.

All period 2 elements completely obey the Madelung rule; in period 2, lithium and beryllium fill the 2s subshell, and boron, carbon, nitrogen, oxygen, fluorine, and neon fill the 2p subshell. The period shares this trait with periods 1 and 3, none of which contain transition elements or inner transition elements, which often vary from the rule.

Chemical element			Block	Electron configuration
3	Li	Lithium	s-block	[He] 2s^{1}
4	Be	Beryllium	s-block	[He] 2s^{2}
5	B	Boron	p-block	[He] 2s^{2} 2p^{1}
6	C	Carbon	p-block	[He] 2s^{2} 2p^{2}
7	N	Nitrogen	p-block	[He] 2s^{2} 2p^{3}
8	O	Oxygen	p-block	[He] 2s^{2} 2p^{4}
9	F	Fluorine	p-block	[He] 2s^{2} 2p^{5}
10	Ne	Neon	p-block	[He] 2s^{2} 2p^{6}

=== Lithium ===
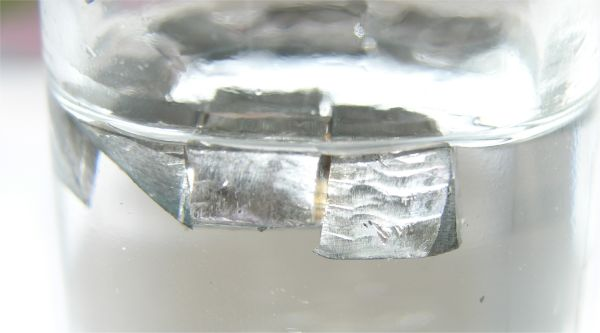
Lithium metal floating on paraffin oil

Lithium (Li) is an alkali metal with atomic number 3, occurring naturally in two isotopes: ^{6}Li and ^{7}Li. The two make up all natural occurrence of lithium on Earth, although further isotopes have been synthesized. In ionic compounds, lithium loses an electron to become positively charged, forming the cation Li^{+}. Lithium is the first alkali metal in the periodic table, (Note: Hydrogen is occasionally referred to as an alkali metal, although this is rare.) and the first metal of any kind in the periodic table. (Note: See note 1.) At standard temperature and pressure, lithium is a soft, silver-white, highly reactive metal. With a density of 0.564 g⋅cm^{−3}, lithium is the lightest metal and the least dense solid element.

Lithium is one of the few elements synthesized in the Big Bang. Lithium is the 31st most abundant element on earth, occurring in concentrations of between 20 and 70 ppm by weight, but due to its high reactivity it is only found naturally in compounds.

Lithium salts are used in the pharmacology industry as mood stabilising drugs. They are used in the treatment of bipolar disorder, where they have a role in treating depression and mania and may reduce the chances of suicide. The most common compounds used are lithium carbonate, Li_{2}CO_{3}, lithium citrate, Li_{3}C_{6}H_{5}O_{7}, lithium sulphate, Li_{2}SO_{4}, and lithium orotate, LiC_{5}H_{3}N_{2}O_{4}·H_{2}O. Lithium is also used in batteries as an anode and its alloys with aluminium, cadmium, copper and manganese are used to make high performance parts for aircraft, most notably the external tank of the Space Shuttle.

=== Beryllium ===
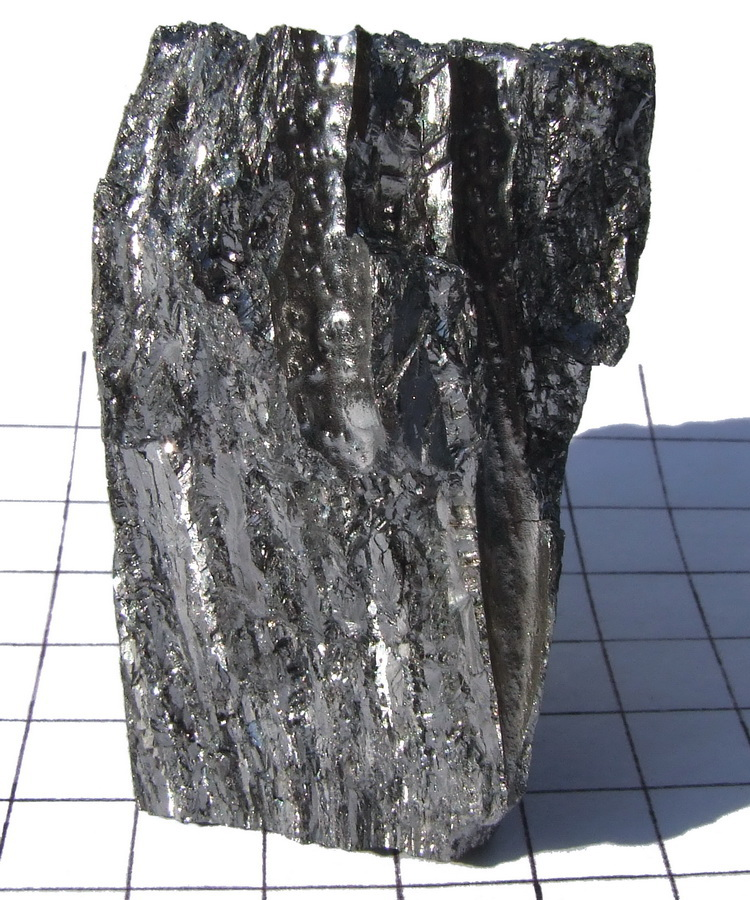
Large piece of beryllium

Beryllium (Be) is the chemical element with atomic number 4, occurring in the form of ^{9}Be. At standard temperature and pressure, beryllium is a strong, steel-grey, light-weight, brittle, bivalent alkaline earth metal, with a density of 1.85 g⋅cm^{−3}. It also has one of the highest melting points of all the light metals. Beryllium's most common isotope is ^{9}Be, which contains 4 protons and 5 neutrons. It makes up almost 100% of all naturally occurring beryllium and is its only stable isotope; however other isotopes have been synthesised. In ionic compounds, beryllium loses its two valence electrons to form the cation, Be^{2+}.

Small amounts of beryllium were synthesised during the Big Bang, although most of it decayed or reacted further to create larger nuclei, like carbon, nitrogen or oxygen. Beryllium is a component of 100 out of 4000 known minerals, such as bertrandite, Be_{4}Si_{2}O_{7}(OH)_{2}, beryl, Al_{2}Be_{3}Si_{6}O_{18}, chrysoberyl, Al_{2}BeO_{4}, and phenakite, Be_{2}SiO_{4}. Precious forms of beryl are aquamarine, red beryl and emerald. The most common sources of beryllium used commercially are beryl and bertrandite and production of it involves the reduction of beryllium fluoride with magnesium metal or the electrolysis of molten beryllium chloride, containing some sodium chloride as beryllium chloride is a poor conductor of electricity.

Due to its stiffness, light weight, and dimensional stability over a wide temperature range, beryllium metal is used as a structural material in aircraft, missiles and communication satellites. It is used as an alloying agent in beryllium copper, which is used to make electrical components due to its high electrical and heat conductivity. Sheets of beryllium are used in X-ray detectors to filter out visible light and let only X-rays through. It is used as a neutron moderator in nuclear reactors because light nuclei are more effective at slowing down neutrons than heavy nuclei. Beryllium's low weight and high rigidity also make it useful in the construction of tweeters in loudspeakers.

Beryllium and beryllium compounds are classified by the International Agency for Research on Cancer as Group 1 carcinogens; they are carcinogenic to both animals and humans. Chronic berylliosis is a pulmonary and systemic granulomatous disease caused by exposure to beryllium. Between 1% – 15% of people are sensitive to beryllium and may develop an inflammatory reaction in their respiratory system and skin, called chronic beryllium disease or berylliosis. The body's immune system recognises the beryllium as foreign particles and mounts an attack against them, usually in the lungs where they are breathed in. This can cause fever, fatigue, weakness, night sweats and difficulty in breathing.

=== Boron ===
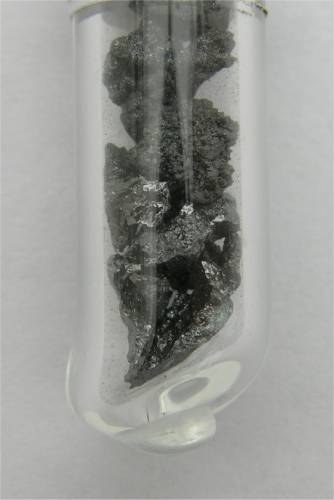
Boron chunks

Boron (B) is the chemical element with atomic number 5, occurring as ^{10}B and ^{11}B. At standard temperature and pressure, boron is a trivalent metalloid that has several different allotropes. Amorphous boron is a brown powder formed as a product of many chemical reactions. Crystalline boron is a very hard, black material with a high melting point and exists in many polymorphs: Two rhombohedral forms, α-boron and β-boron containing 12 and 106.7 atoms in the rhombohedral unit cell respectively, and 50-atom tetragonal boron are the most common. Boron has a density of 2.34^{−3}. Boron's most common isotope is ^{11}B at 80.22%, which contains 5 protons and 6 neutrons. The other common isotope is ^{10}B at 19.78%, which contains 5 protons and 5 neutrons. These are the only stable isotopes of boron; however other isotopes have been synthesised. Boron forms covalent bonds with other nonmetals and has oxidation states of 1, 2, 3 and 4. Boron does not occur naturally as a free element, but in compounds such as borates. The most common sources of boron are tourmaline, borax, Na_{2}B_{4}O_{5}(OH)_{4}·8H_{2}O, and kernite, Na_{2}B_{4}O_{5}(OH)_{4}·2H_{2}O. It is difficult to obtain pure boron. It can be made through the magnesium reduction of boron trioxide, B_{2}O_{3}. This oxide is made by melting boric acid, B(OH)_{3}, which in turn is obtained from borax. Small amounts of pure boron can be made by the thermal decomposition of boron bromide, BBr_{3}, in hydrogen gas over hot tantalum wire, which acts as a catalyst. The most commercially important sources of boron are: sodium tetraborate pentahydrate, Na_{2}B_{4}O_{7} · 5H_{2}O, which is used in large amounts in making insulating fiberglass and sodium perborate bleach; boron carbide, a ceramic material, is used to make armour materials, especially in bulletproof vests for soldiers and police officers; orthoboric acid, H_{3}BO_{3} or boric acid, used in the production of textile fiberglass and flat panel displays; sodium tetraborate decahydrate, Na_{2}B_{4}O_{7} · 10H_{2}O or borax, used in the production of adhesives; and the isotope boron-10 is used as a control for nuclear reactors, as a shield for nuclear radiation, and in instruments used for detecting neutrons.

Boron is an essential plant micronutrient, required for cell wall strength and development, cell division, seed and fruit development, sugar transport and hormone development. However, high soil concentrations of over 1.0 ppm can cause necrosis in leaves and poor growth. Levels as low as 0.8 ppm can cause these symptoms to appear in plants particularly boron-sensitive. Most plants, even those tolerant of boron in the soil, will show symptoms of boron toxicity when boron levels are higher than 1.8 ppm. In animals, boron is an ultratrace element; in human diets, daily intake ranges from 2.1 to 4.3 mg boron/kg body weight (bw)/day. It is also used as a supplement for the prevention and treatment of osteoporosis and arthritis.

=== Carbon ===
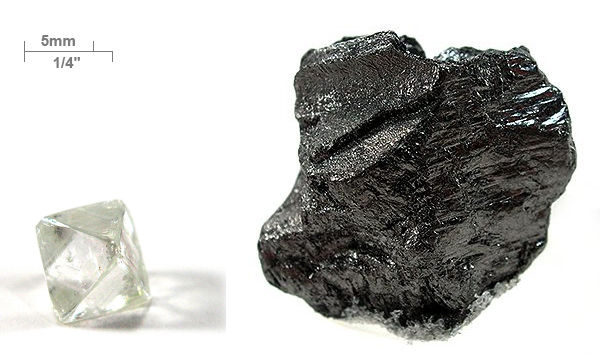
Diamond and graphite, two different allotropes of carbon

Carbon is the chemical element with atomic number 6, occurring as ^{12}C, ^{13}C and ^{14}C. At standard temperature and pressure, carbon is a solid, occurring in many different allotropes, the most common of which are graphite, diamond, the fullerenes and amorphous carbon. Graphite is a soft, hexagonal crystalline, opaque black semimetal with very good conductive and thermodynamically stable properties. Diamond however is a highly transparent colourless cubic crystal with poor conductive properties, is the hardest known naturally occurring mineral and has the highest refractive index of all gemstones. In contrast to the crystal lattice structure of diamond and graphite, the fullerenes are molecules, named after Richard Buckminster Fuller whose architecture the molecules resemble. There are several different fullerenes, the most widely known being the "buckeyball" C_{60}. Little is known about the fullerenes and they are a current subject of research. There is also amorphous carbon, which is carbon without any crystalline structure. In mineralogy, the term is used to refer to soot and coal, although these are not truly amorphous as they contain small amounts of graphite or diamond. Carbon's most common isotope at 98.9% is ^{12}C, with six protons and six neutrons. ^{13}C is also stable, with six protons and seven neutrons, at 1.1%. Trace amounts of ^{14}C also occur naturally but this isotope is radioactive and decays with a half-life of 5730 years; it is used for radiocarbon dating. Other isotopes of carbon have also been synthesised. Carbon forms covalent bonds with other non-metals with an oxidation state of −4, −2, +2 or +4.

Carbon is the fourth most abundant element in the universe by mass after hydrogen, helium and oxygen and is the second most abundant element in the human body by mass after oxygen, the third most abundant by number of atoms. There are an almost infinite number of compounds that contain carbon due to carbon's ability to form long stable chains of C–C bonds. The simplest carbon-containing molecules are the hydrocarbons, which contain carbon and hydrogen, although they sometimes contain other elements in functional groups. Hydrocarbons are used as fossil fuels and to manufacture plastics and petrochemicals. All organic compounds, those essential for life, contain at least one atom of carbon. When combined with oxygen and hydrogen, carbon can form many groups of important biological compounds including sugars, lignans, chitins, alcohols, fats, and aromatic esters, carotenoids and terpenes. With nitrogen it forms alkaloids, and with the addition of sulfur also it forms antibiotics, amino acids, and rubber products. With the addition of phosphorus to these other elements, it forms DNA and RNA, the chemical-code carriers of life, and adenosine triphosphate (ATP), the most important energy-transfer molecule in all living cells.

=== Nitrogen ===
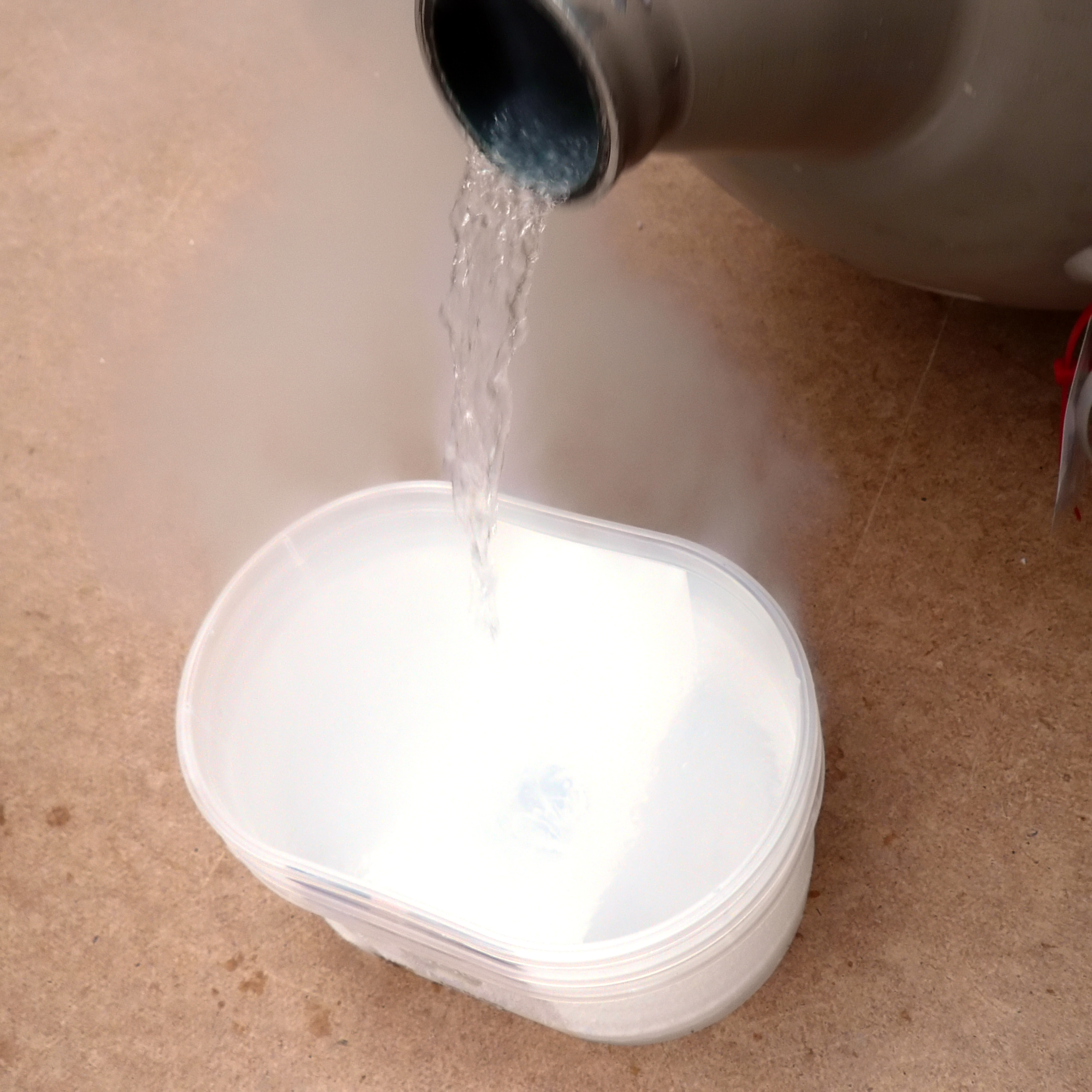
Liquid nitrogen being poured

Nitrogen is the chemical element with atomic number 7, the symbol N and atomic mass 14.00674 u. Elemental nitrogen is a colorless, odorless, tasteless and mostly inert diatomic gas at standard conditions, constituting 78.08% by volume of Earth's atmosphere. The element nitrogen was discovered as a separable component of air, by Scottish physician Daniel Rutherford, in 1772. It occurs naturally in form of two isotopes: nitrogen-14 and nitrogen-15.

Many industrially important compounds, such as ammonia, nitric acid, organic nitrates (propellants and explosives), and cyanides, contain nitrogen. The extremely strong bond in elemental nitrogen dominates nitrogen chemistry, causing difficulty for both organisms and industry in breaking the bond to convert the N_{2} molecule into useful compounds, but at the same time causing release of large amounts of often useful energy when the compounds burn, explode, or decay back into nitrogen gas.

Nitrogen occurs in all living organisms, and the nitrogen cycle describes movement of the element from air into the biosphere and organic compounds, then back into the atmosphere. Synthetically produced nitrates are key ingredients of industrial fertilizers, and also key pollutants in causing the eutrophication of water systems. Nitrogen is a constituent element of amino acids and thus of proteins, and of nucleic acids (DNA and RNA). It resides in the chemical structure of almost all neurotransmitters, and is a defining component of alkaloids, biological molecules produced by many organisms.

=== Oxygen ===
Oxygen is the chemical element with atomic number 8, occurring mostly as ^{16}O, but also ^{17}O and ^{18}O.

Oxygen is the third-most common element by mass in the universe (although there are more carbon atoms, each carbon atom is lighter). It is highly electronegative and non-metallic, usually diatomic, gas down to very low temperatures. Only fluorine is more reactive among non-metallic elements. It is two electrons short of a full octet and readily takes electrons from other elements. It reacts violently with alkali metals and white phosphorus at room temperature and less violently with alkali earth metals heavier than magnesium. At higher temperatures it burns most other metals and many non-metals (including hydrogen, carbon, and sulfur). Many oxides are extremely stable substances difficult to decompose—like water, carbon dioxide, alumina, silica, and iron oxides (the latter often appearing as rust). Oxygen is part of substances best described as some salts of metals and oxygen-containing acids (nitrates, sulfates, phosphates, silicates, and carbonates).

Oxygen is essential to all life. Plants and phytoplankton photosynthesize carbon dioxide and water, both oxides, in the presence of sunlight to form sugars with the release of oxygen. The sugars are then turned into such substances as cellulose and (with nitrogen and often sulfur) proteins and other essential substances of life. Animals especially but also fungi and bacteria ultimately depend upon photosynthesizing plants and phytoplankton for food and oxygen.

Fire uses oxygen to oxidize compounds typically of carbon and hydrogen to water and carbon dioxide (although other elements may be involved) whether in uncontrolled conflagrations that destroy buildings and forests or the controlled fire within engines or that supply electrical energy from turbines, heat for keeping buildings warm, or the motive force that drives vehicles.

Oxygen forms roughly 21% of the Earth's atmosphere; all of this oxygen is the result of photosynthesis. Pure oxygen has use in medical treatment of people who have respiratory difficulties. Excess oxygen is toxic.

Oxygen was originally associated with the formation of acids—until some acids were shown to not have oxygen in them. Oxygen is named for its formation of acids, especially with non-metals. Some oxides of some non-metals are extremely acidic, like sulfur trioxide, which forms sulfuric acid on contact with water. Most oxides with metals are alkaline, some extremely so, like potassium oxide. Some metallic oxides are amphoteric, like aluminum oxide, which means that they can react with both acids and bases.

Although oxygen is normally a diatomic gas, oxygen can form an allotrope known as ozone. Ozone is a triatomic gas even more reactive than oxygen. Unlike regular diatomic oxygen, ozone is a toxic material generally considered a pollutant. In the upper atmosphere, some oxygen forms ozone which has the property of absorbing dangerous ultraviolet rays within the ozone layer. Land life was impossible before the formation of an ozone layer.

=== Fluorine ===
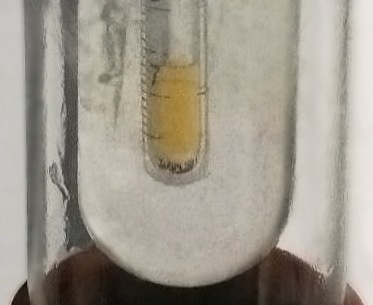
Liquid fluorine in ampoule

Fluorine is the chemical element with atomic number 9. It occurs naturally in its only stable form ^{19}F.

Fluorine is a pale-yellow, diatomic gas under normal conditions and down to very low temperatures. Short one electron of the highly stable octet in each atom, fluorine molecules are unstable enough that they easily snap, with loose fluorine atoms tending to grab single electrons from just about any other element. Fluorine is the most reactive of all elements, and it even attacks many oxides to replace oxygen with fluorine. Fluorine even attacks silica, one of the favored materials for transporting strong acids, and burns asbestos. It attacks common salt, one of the most stable compounds, with the release of chlorine. It never appears uncombined in nature and almost never stays uncombined for long. It burns hydrogen simultaneously if either is liquid or gaseous—even at temperatures close to absolute zero. It is extremely difficult to isolate from any compounds, let alone keep uncombined.

Fluorine gas is extremely dangerous because it attacks almost all organic material, including live flesh. Many of the binary compounds that it forms (called fluorides) are themselves highly toxic, including soluble fluorides and especially hydrogen fluoride. Fluorine forms very strong bonds with many elements. With sulfur it can form the extremely stable and chemically inert sulfur hexafluoride; with carbon it can form the remarkable material Teflon that is a stable and non-combustible solid with a high melting point and a very low coefficient of friction that makes it an excellent liner for cooking pans and raincoats. Fluorine-carbon compounds include some unique plastics. It is also used as a reactant in the making of toothpaste.

=== Neon ===
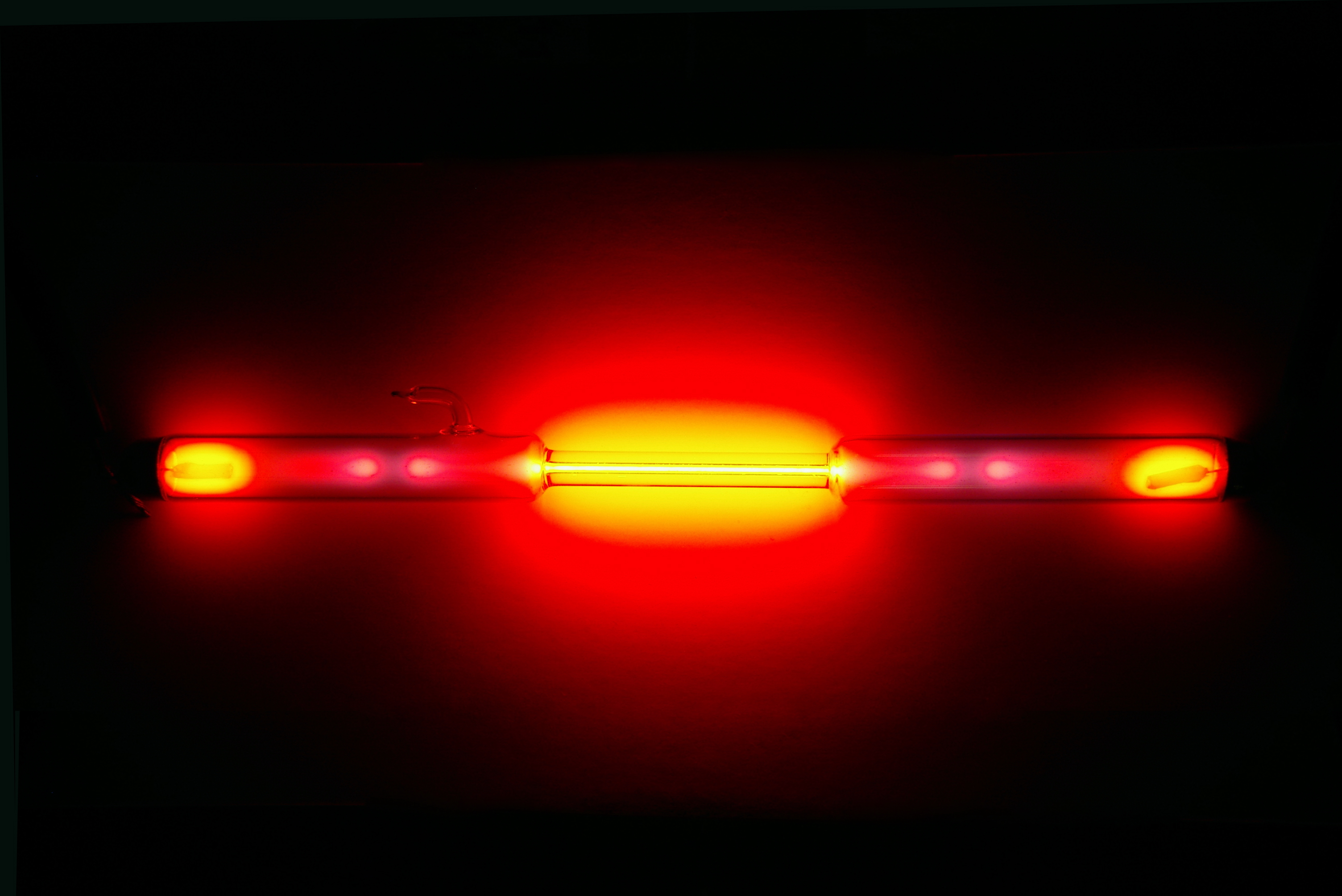
Neon discharge tube

Neon is the chemical element with atomic number 10, occurring naturally as three stable isotopes: ^{20}Ne, ^{21}Ne and ^{22}Ne.

Neon is a monatomic gas. With a complete octet of outer electrons, it is highly resistant to electron removal and does not readily accept electrons, making it effectively inert. It is classified as one of the noble gases.

Although relatively scarce on Earth, neon is the fifth most abundant element in the universe, formed during the alpha process in stars. On Earth it is obtained by fractional distillation of liquid air, where it is present at about 18 ppm by volume in the atmosphere. Neon has no known biological role.

The element is best known for its distinctive orange-red glow in low-pressure gas-discharge tubes and neon advertising signs, first demonstrated in 1910 by Georges Claude. Neon is also used in high-voltage indicators, lightning arresters, plasma screens, cryogenic refrigeration (due to its low boiling point), and as a component in some lasers.
