= Lithium (medication) =

Mood-stabilizing psychiatric medication

Lithium salt

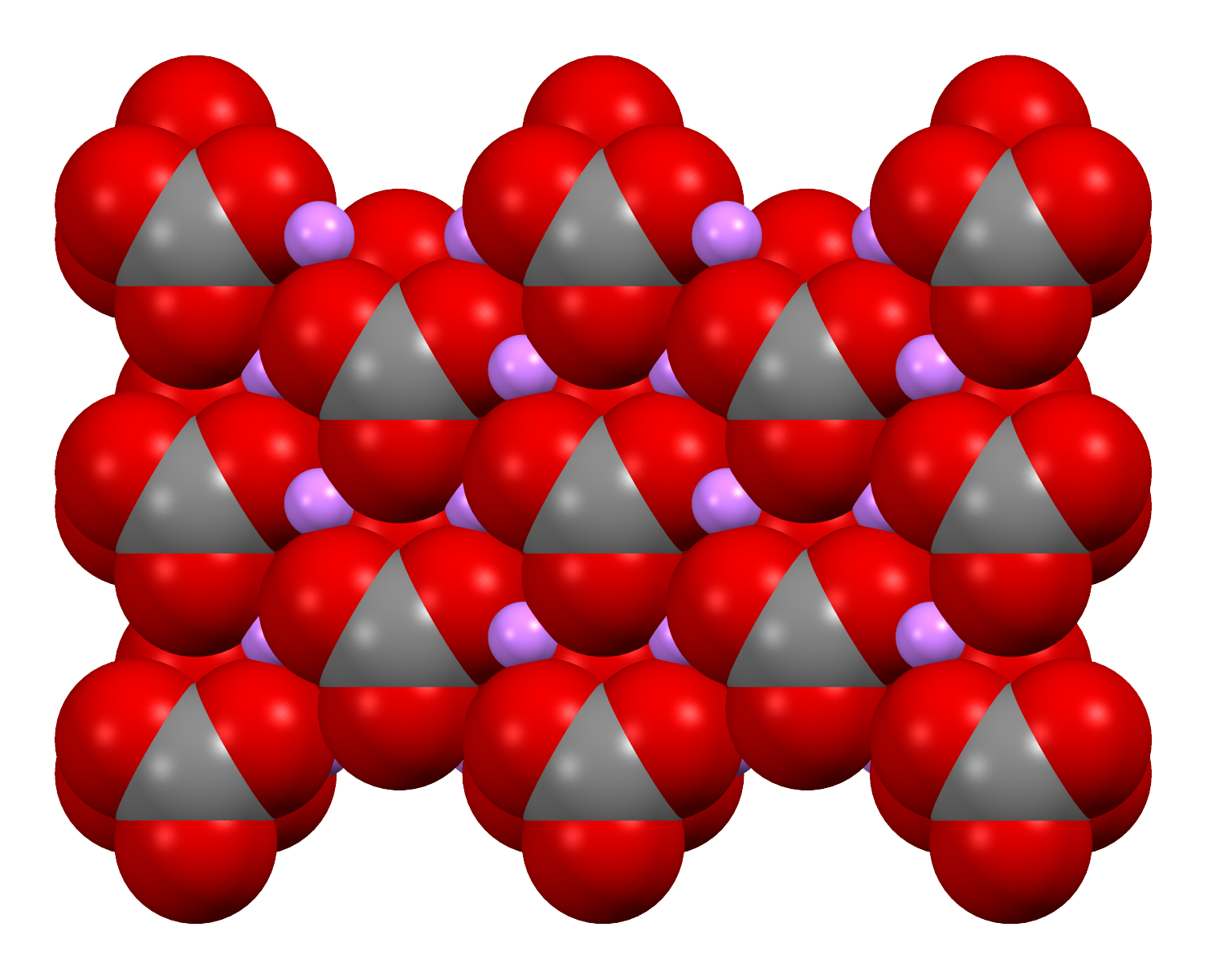
- Lithium carbonate, an example of a lithium salt

Clinical data
- Trade names: Lithane, others
- AHFS/Drugs.com: Monograph
- MedlinePlus: a681039
- License data: US DailyMed: Lithium
- Pregnancy category: AU: D
- Routes of administration: By mouth, parenteral
- Drug class: Mood stabilizer
- ATC code: N05AN01 (WHO) V04CX11 (WHO), D11AX04 (WHO)

Legal status
- Legal status: AU: S4 (Prescription only); BR: Class C1 (Other controlled substances); CA: ℞-only; UK: POM (Prescription only); US: ℞-only

Pharmacokinetic data
- Protein binding: None
- Metabolism: Kidney
- Elimination half-life: 24 h, 36 h (elderly)
- Excretion: >95% kidney

Identifiers
- IUPAC name: Lithium(1+)
- CAS Number: 17341-24-1
- PubChem CID: 28486; 11125
- DrugBank: DB01356
- ChemSpider: 26502
- UNII: 8H8Z5UER66; 2BMD2GNA4V
- KEGG: D00801; D04749
- ChEBI: CHEBI:49713

Chemical and physical data
- Formula: Li^{+}
- Molar mass: 6.94 g·mol^{−1}
- 3D model (JSmol): Interactive image
- SMILES: [Li+]
- InChI: InChI=1S/Li/q+1; Key:HBBGRARXTFLTSG-UHFFFAOYSA-N

Certain lithium compounds, also known as lithium salts, are used as psychiatric medication, primarily for bipolar disorder and for major depressive disorder. Lithium is taken orally (by mouth).

Common side effects include increased urination, shakiness of the hands, and increased thirst. Serious side effects include hypothyroidism, diabetes insipidus, and lithium toxicity. Blood level monitoring is recommended to decrease the risk of potential toxicity. If levels become too high, diarrhea, vomiting, poor coordination, sleepiness, and ringing in the ears may occur.

Lithium is teratogenic and can cause birth defects at high doses, especially during the first trimester of pregnancy. The use of lithium while breastfeeding is controversial; many international health authorities advise against it, and the long-term outcomes of perinatal lithium exposure have not been studied. The American Academy of Pediatrics lists lithium as contraindicated for pregnancy and lactation. The United States Food and Drug Administration (FDA) categorizes lithium as having positive evidence of risk for pregnancy and possible hazardous risk for lactation.

Lithium salts are classified as mood stabilizers. Lithium's mechanism of action is not known.

In the nineteenth century, lithium was used in people who had gout, epilepsy, and cancer. Its use in the treatment of mental disorders began with Carl Lange in Denmark and William Alexander Hammond in New York City, who used lithium to treat mania from the 1870s onwards, based on now-discredited theories involving its effect on uric acid. Use of lithium for mental disorders was re-established (on a different theoretical basis) in 1948 by John Cade in Australia.

Lithium carbonate is on the World Health Organization's List of Essential Medicines, and is available as a generic medication. In 2023, it was the 187th most commonly prescribed medication in the United States, with more than 2 million prescriptions. It appears to be underused in older people, and in certain countries, for reasons including patients' negative beliefs about lithium.

== Medical uses ==
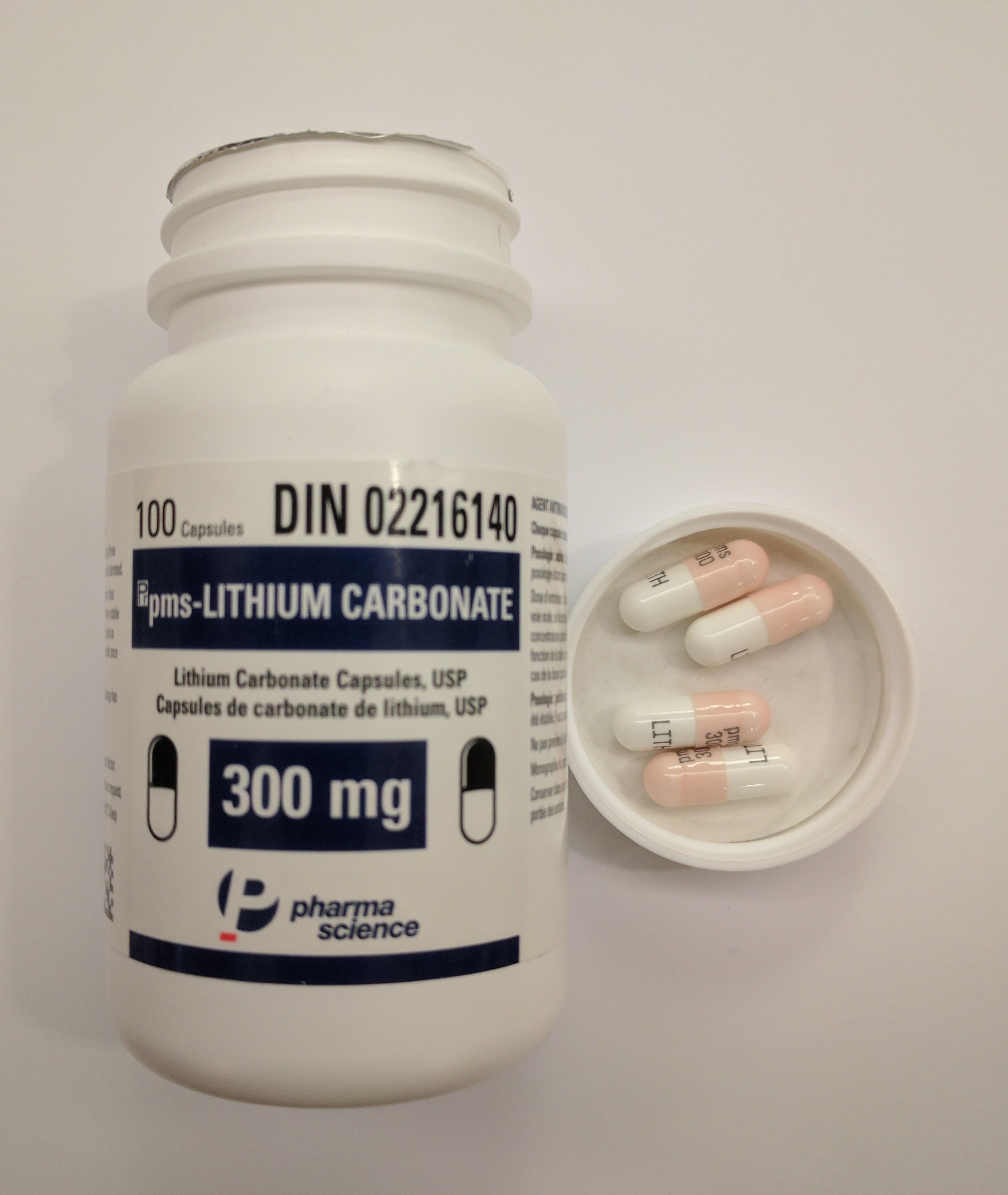
A bottle of lithium medicine containing 300 mg capsules of lithium carbonate

In 1970, lithium was approved by the United States Food and Drug Administration for the treatment of bipolar disorder, which remains its primary use in the United States. It is sometimes used when other treatments are not effective in a number of other conditions, including major depression, schizophrenia, disorders of impulse control, and some psychiatric disorders in children. Because the FDA has not approved lithium for the treatment of other disorders, such use is off-label. Lithium is unique among medications in that it is proven to have preventive effects on suicide in mood disorders, such as bipolar disorder and recurrent major depression.

The mechanisms of biological action of lithium are only partially understood. For instance, studies of lithium-treated patients with bipolar disorder show that, among many other effects, lithium partially reverses telomere shortening in these patients and also increases mitochondrial function, although how lithium produces these pharmacological effects is not understood. High blood levels of lithium can lead to lithium toxicity.

=== Bipolar disorder ===
Lithium is primarily used as a maintenance drug in the treatment of bipolar disorder to stabilize mood and prevent manic episodes. It is also effective in the acute treatment of manic episodes. It is effective for mania within the first 7 days of treatment.

For acute treatment, although recommended by treatment guidelines for the treatment of depression in bipolar disorder, the evidence that lithium is superior to placebo for acute bipolar depression is low-quality. Atypical antipsychotics are considered more effective for treating acute bipolar depressive episodes. Lithium is effective for the long term prevention of bipolar depressive episodes.

Lithium treatment was previously considered to be unsuitable for children, however more recent studies show its effectiveness for treatment of early-onset bipolar disorder in children as young as eight. The required dosage is slightly less than the toxic level (representing a low therapeutic index), requiring close monitoring of blood levels of lithium during treatment. Within the therapeutic range there is a dose-response relationship.

A limited amount of evidence suggests lithium carbonate may contribute to the treatment of substance use disorders for some people with bipolar disorder. People with bipolar disorder are at a 3 times higher risk for dementia. Lithium reduces the risk of dementia by 50% among people with bipolar disorder.

=== Schizophrenic disorders ===
Lithium is recommended for the treatment of schizophrenic disorders only after other antipsychotics have failed; it has limited effectiveness when used alone. Clinical studies on the efficacy of combined use of lithium and antipsychotic for treating schizophrenic disorders have produced varying results.

=== Major depressive disorder ===
Lithium is widely prescribed as an adjunct treatment for depression.

==== Augmentation ====
If therapy with antidepressants (such as selective serotonin reuptake inhibitors [SSRIs]) does not fully treat and discontinue the symptoms of major depressive disorder (MDD) (also known as refractory depression or treatment resistant depression [TRD]) then a second augmentation agent is sometimes added to the therapy. Lithium is one of the few augmentation agents for antidepressants to demonstrate efficacy in treating MDD in multiple randomized controlled trials and it has been prescribed (off-label) for this purpose since the 1980s. A 2019 systematic review found that as an adjunct to antidepressants, lithium was much more effective than placebo. The studies in the review ranged from the 1970s to the 2000s.

While SSRIs have been mentioned above as a drug class in which lithium is used to augment, there are other classes in which lithium is added to increase effectiveness. Such classes are antipsychotics (used for bipolar disorder) as well as antiepileptic drugs (used for both psychiatric and epileptic cases). Lamotrigine and topiramate are two specific antiepileptic drugs in which lithium is used to augment.

==== Monotherapy ====
There are old studies indicating efficacy of lithium for acute depression with lithium having the same efficacy as tricyclic antidepressants. A 2019 systemic review of studies from the 1970s to 2000s found that lithium monotherapy was just as effective as antidepressant monotherapy.

=== Prevention of suicide ===
Lithium has been shown to reduce the risk of suicide in individuals with bipolar disorder or major depression to close to the same level as that of the general population. It is thought to exert this effect by treating the underlying mood disorder and through a reduction in impulsivity and aggressiveness. Lithium is proven to reduce the risk of suicide in mood disorders by 87% in randomized double-blind placebo-controlled trials. Some meta-analyses have not found a statistically significant association between lithium and a reduction in suicide, however these meta-analyses are disputed. Some evidence suggests lithium is effective in significantly reducing the risk of self-harm and unintentional injury for bipolar disorder in comparison to no treatment and to antipsychotics or valproate. In addition, lithium decreases all-cause mortality in people with bipolar disorder.

The increased presence of trace amounts of lithium in drinking water is correlated with lower overall suicide rates, especially among men. Lithium in drinking water is also associated with lower rates of homicide, rape, drug arrests, and other crimes.

=== Cluster headaches, migraine, and hypnic headache ===
Studies testing prophylactic use of lithium in cluster headaches (when compared to verapamil), migraine attacks, and hypnic headache indicate good efficacy.

=== Monitoring ===
Those who use lithium should receive regular serum level tests and should monitor thyroid and kidney function for abnormalities, as it interferes with the regulation of sodium and water levels in the body, and can cause dehydration. Dehydration, which is compounded by heat, can result in increasing lithium levels. The dehydration is due to lithium inhibition of the action of antidiuretic hormone, which normally enables the kidney to reabsorb water from urine. This causes an inability to concentrate urine, leading to consequent loss of body water and thirst.

Lithium concentrations in whole blood, plasma, serum, or urine may be measured using instrumental techniques as a guide to therapy, to confirm the diagnosis in potential poisoning victims, or to assist in the forensic investigation in a case of fatal overdosage. In clinical settings, lithium doses are adjusted to achieve a target serum concentration, usually measured 12 hours after the last dose (12-hour trough level).

==== Lithium levels ====
According to Stahl's Prescriber's Guide, target concentrations for acute mania should be 1.0–1.5 mEq/L. 0.6–1.0 mEq/L for depression, and 0.7–1.0 mEq/L for long-term maintenance of bipolar disorder. In the elderly, lower doses and lower lithium levels (<0.6 mEq/L) are often adequate and advisable. The Maudsley and Ghaemi prescriber's guides recommend a slightly lower lithium level of 0.8–1.0 mmol/L for acute mania.

For the maintenance treatment of bipolar disorder, the International Society for Bipolar Disorders (ISBD) and International Study Group on Lithium (ISGL) guidelines recommend lithium levels of 0.6–0.8 mmol/L. In the case of good response but poor tolerance, the guidelines recommend a level of 0.4–0.6 mmol/L. In the case of insufficient response but good tolerance, the guidelines recommend a level of 0.8–1.0 mmol/L.

For the maintenance treatment of the elderly, the ISBD and ISGL guidelines recommend a more conservative approach of levels of 0.4–0.6 mmol/L, with the option to go up to 0.7 or 0.8 mmol/L at ages 65–79, and up to a maximum of 0.7 mmol/L over age 80.

As a result of lithium's narrow therapeutic index, toxic effects can occur at serum concentrations close to therapeutic levels, necessitating close monitoring during treatment. Initially, levels are measured every 1–2 weeks until the desired serum concentration is achieved, then every 2–3 months for the first 6 months. Once stable, levels are measured every 6–12 months.

Levels of 1.2–1.5 mmol/L are considered borderline toxic. Levels above 1.5 mmol/L are considered toxic. Levels above 2.0 mmol/L may lead to disorientation, renal failure, seizures, and coma.

==== Thyroid ====
Given the rates of thyroid dysfunction, thyroid parameters should be checked before lithium is instituted and monitored after 3–6 months and then every 6–12 months. Thyroid stimulating hormone (TSH) levels are usually checked. The level of free thyroxine (free T4) can also be checked to detect subclinical hypothyroidism where the level of 'free T4' is low even if the level of TSH shows as normal.

==== Kidney ====
Given the risks of kidney malfunction, serum creatinine and eGFR should be checked before lithium is instituted and monitored after 3–6 months at regular intervals. Patients who have a rise in creatinine on three or more occasions, even if their eGFR is > 60 ml/min/1.73 m^{2} require further evaluation, including a urinalysis for hematuria, and proteinuria, a review of their medical history with attention paid to cardiovascular, urological, and medication history, and blood pressure control and management. Overt proteinuria should be further quantified with a urine protein-to-creatinine ratio.

==== Discontinuation ====
If lithium is stopped suddenly, there is a 50% risk of sudden mania within one month of stopping. In the first year after discontinuation of lithium, there is up to a 20-fold increase in the rate of suicide or attempted suicide compared to lithium maintenance.

If discontinuing lithium, it is recommended to taper it gradually and in a controlled fashion. Gradual tapering has been shown to lower the risk of relapse and suicidal events. In patients gradually tapering off the medication, discontinuation symptoms including irritability or restlessness, and somatic symptoms like vertigo, dizziness, or lightheadedness may occur. Discontinuation symptoms are generally mild and self-limiting within weeks.

== Adverse effects ==
The adverse effects of lithium include:

Very Common (> 10% incidence) adverse effects

- Confusion
- Constipation (usually transient, but can persist in some)
- Decreased memory
- Diarrhea (usually transient, but can persist in some)
- Dry mouth
- ECG changes – usually benign changes in T waves
- Hand tremor (usually transient, but can persist in some) with an incidence of 27%. If severe, the psychiatrist may lower lithium dosage, change lithium salt type or modify lithium preparation from long to short-acting (despite lacking evidence for these procedures) or use pharmacological help
- Headache
- Hyperreflexia – overresponsive reflexes
- Leukocytosis – elevated white blood cell count
- Muscle weakness (usually transient, but can persist in some)
- Myoclonus – muscle twitching
- Nausea (usually transient)
- Polydipsia – increased thirst
- Polyuria – increased urination
- Renal (kidney) toxicity which may lead to chronic kidney failure, although some cases may be misattributed
- Vomiting (usually transient, but can persist in some)
- Vertigo

Common (1–10%) adverse effects

- Acne
- Extrapyramidal side effects – movement-related problems such as muscle rigidity, parkinsonism, dystonia, etc.
- Euthyroid goitre – i.e. the formation of a goitre despite normal thyroid functioning
- Hypothyroidism – a deficiency of thyroid hormone. Common among bipolar patients; lithium increases rates.
- Hair loss/hair thinning
- Weight gain – 5% incidence, tends to start fast and then plateau. Usually ends at 1–2 kg. A 2022 systematic review and meta-analysis show an insignificant amount of weight gain of 0.462 kg, with higher weight gain associated with shorter use periods. Lithium had significantly lower weight gain compared to active comparators.

Unknown incidence

- Sexual dysfunction
- Hypoglycemia – low blood sugar
- Glycosuria – excretion of glucose into the urine

In addition to tremors, lithium treatment appears to be a risk factor for development of parkinsonism-like symptoms, although the causal mechanism remains unknown. Depending on dosage and duration of use, lithium can be either pro-convulsant, or as its historical use suggests, anti-convulsant. Studies show that lithium does not decrease neurocognitive performance, and may actually improve neurocognitive performance in people with bipolar disorder.

Most side effects of lithium are dose-dependent. The lowest effective dose is used to limit the risk of side effects.

=== Hypothyroidism ===
The rate of hypothyroidism is around six times higher in people who take lithium. Low thyroid hormone levels in turn increase the likelihood of developing depression. People taking lithium thus should routinely be assessed for hypothyroidism and treated with synthetic thyroxine if necessary. Lithium associated thyroid dysfunction is reversible and thyroid levels return to normal if lithium is discontinued. However, hypothyroidism can be corrected by treatment with thyroxine and does not require the lithium dose to be adjusted.

=== Hyperparathyroidism ===
Lithium-associated hyperparathyroidism leads to hypercalcemia in about 4% of lithium-treated patients. Calcium levels should be checked for patients undergoing long-term lithium treatment. Chronically increased serum calcium can lead to kidney stones, osteoporosis, dyspepsia, hypertension, and renal impairment. Lithium may lead to exacerbation of pre-existing primary hyperparathyroidism or cause an increased set-point of calcium for parathyroid hormone suppression, leading to parathyroid hyperplasia.

=== Kidney damage ===
Lithium has been associated with several forms of kidney injury. It is estimated that impaired urinary concentrating ability is present in at least half of individuals on chronic lithium therapy, a condition called lithium-induced nephrogenic diabetes insipidus, or lithium-induced AVP resistance. This occurs because lithium competes with the antidiuretic hormone in the kidney and increases water output into the urine.

Clearance of lithium by the kidneys is usually successful with certain diuretic medications, including amiloride and triamterene. Continued use of lithium can lead to more serious kidney damage in an aggravated form of nephrogenic diabetes insipidus. Lithium specifically inhibits function of the aquaporin-2 water channel, leading to impaired reabsorption of water, polyuria, polydipsia, significant hypernatremia, which can lead to CNS symptoms such as confusion, lethargy, and coma.

Chronic kidney disease, otherwise known as chronic renal insufficiency (CRI), occurs in 1–5% of people after 10–20 years of lithium treatment. End-stage renal disease occurs in 0.53% of people treated with lithium versus 0.2% in the general population. Kidney harm can be mitigated by keeping the lithium dose as low as possible and dosing lithium once per day at night. Multiple daily doses are associated with more kidney damage. Dosing lithium once per day allows for long periods where the kidney is exposed to low levels of lithium, which minimizes kidney harm.

=== Pregnancy ===
Lithium is a teratogen, which can cause birth defects in a small number of newborns. Case reports and several retrospective studies have demonstrated possible increases in the rate of a congenital heart defects (CHDs) including Ebstein's anomaly if taken during the first trimester of pregnancy. The risk is dose-dependent: in the 2017 AMX registry study, the relative risk of "any malformations" is 1.11 in those taking no more than 600 mg of lithium carbonate daily, 1.60 in those taking 601–900 mg daily, and 3.22 in those taking more than 900 mg daily. The first two numbers do not indicate a statistically significant association. In a 2018 meta-analysis, there was a statistically significant 62% increase (95% CI: 12%–133%) in congenital malformations in general, but not for cardiac malformations specifically. Exposure during any part of the pregnancy is associated with a slight but statistically significant increase in the risks of preterm birth and of a larger-than-usual baby at birth.

Lithium is effective for preventing relapse during and after pregnancy. As the risks of stopping Lithium can be significant, patients are sometimes recommended to stay on this medicine while pregnant. Careful weighing of the risks and benefits should be made in consultation with a psychiatric physician. The relatively low teratogenic risk of lithium allows such a choice. The decision should be made before the start of pregnancy, as there is no reason for stopping lithium once the pregnancy has started.

For patients who are exposed to lithium, or plan to stay on the medication throughout their pregnancy, fetal echocardiography is routinely performed to monitor for cardiac anomalies. Pregnancy is associated with a decrease in blood lithium levels (especially in the first and second trimesters), so more frequent monitoring with an increase in dose may be required to maintain control of symptoms. To prevent postpartum psychosis, a higher blood lithium level may be desirable in the third trimester.

Initiating lithium immediately after delivery is also effective for preventing postpartum psychosis and postpartum bipolar relapse. This is an acceptable treatment option for women with a history of psychosis limited to the postpartum period. For women with diagnosed bipolar disorder, this provides less protection than maintaining lithium therapy during pregnancy.

=== Breastfeeding ===
While only small amounts of lithium are transmitted to the infant in breastmilk, there is limited data on the safety of breastfeeding while on lithium. Medical evaluation and monitoring of infants consuming breastmilk during maternal prescription may be indicated.

== Interactions ==
Lithium plasma concentrations are known to be increased with concurrent use of diuretics—especially loop diuretics (such as furosemide) and thiazides—and non-steroidal anti-inflammatory drugs (NSAIDs) such as ibuprofen. Lithium concentrations can also be increased with concurrent use of ACE inhibitors such as captopril, enalapril, and lisinopril.

Lithium is primarily cleared from the body through glomerular filtration, but some is then reabsorbed together with sodium through the proximal tubule. Its levels are therefore sensitive to water and electrolyte balance. Diuretics act by lowering water and sodium levels; this causes more reabsorption of lithium in the proximal tubules so that the removal of lithium from the body is less, leading to increased blood levels of lithium.

ACE inhibitors have also been shown in a retrospective case-control study to increase lithium concentrations. This is likely due to constriction of the afferent arteriole of the glomerulus, resulting in decreased glomerular filtration rate and clearance. Another possible mechanism is that ACE inhibitors can lead to a decrease in sodium and water. This will increase lithium reabsorption and its concentrations in the body.

Some drugs can increase the clearance of lithium from the body, which can result in decreased lithium levels in the blood. These drugs include theophylline, caffeine, and acetazolamide. Additionally, increasing dietary sodium intake may also reduce lithium levels by prompting the kidneys to excrete more lithium.

Lithium is known to be a potential precipitant of serotonin syndrome in people concurrently on serotonergic medications such as antidepressants, buspirone and certain opioids such as pethidine (meperidine), tramadol, oxycodone, fentanyl and others. Lithium co-treatment is also a risk factor for neuroleptic malignant syndrome in people on antipsychotics and other antidopaminergic medications.

High doses of haloperidol, fluphenazine, or flupenthixol may be hazardous when used with lithium; irreversible toxic encephalopathy has been reported. Indeed, these and other antipsychotics have been associated with an increased risk of lithium neurotoxicity, even with low therapeutic lithium doses.

A high incidence of seizures has been reported with serotonergic psychedelics like psilocybin and LSD in people taking lithium. In an analysis of online reports, 47% of 62 accounts reported seizures when a psychedelic was taken while on lithium. Of these instances, 39% sought emergency medical treatment.

== Overdose ==
Lithium toxicity, which is also called "lithium overdose" or "lithium poisoning", is the condition of having too much lithium in the blood. This condition also happens in persons who are taking lithium in which the lithium levels are affected by drug interactions in the body.

Lithium toxicity occurs at levels above 1.5 mmol/L. Lithium levels above 2.0 mmol/L can lead to disorientation, renal failure, seizures, and coma. Above 2.0 mmol/L, acute renal failure can occur, and kidney dialysis may be used. In the elderly, signs of toxicity can occur at half the levels of younger patients.

In acute toxicity, people have primarily gastrointestinal symptoms such as vomiting and diarrhea, which may result in volume depletion. During acute toxicity, lithium distributes later into the central nervous system resulting in mild neurological symptoms, such as dizziness.

In chronic toxicity, people have primarily neurological symptoms which include nystagmus, tremor, hyperreflexia, ataxia, and change in mental status. During chronic toxicity, the gastrointestinal symptoms seen in acute toxicity are less prominent. The symptoms are often vague and nonspecific. If the lithium toxicity is mild or moderate, lithium dosage is reduced or stopped entirely. If the toxicity is severe, lithium may need to be removed from the body.

== Mechanism of action ==
Unlike many other psychoactive drugs, lithium typically produces no obvious psychotropic effects (such as euphoria) in normal individuals at therapeutic concentrations. The specific biochemical mechanism of lithium action in stabilizing mood is unknown. However, it is known that lithium works at the level of G-proteins, PIP_{2}, and other second messengers.

Lithium carbonate is a white, odorless, alkaline powder. Upon ingestion, lithium becomes widely distributed in the central nervous system and interacts with a number of neurotransmitters and receptors, decreasing norepinephrine release and increasing serotonin synthesis by neurons in the brain.

In vitro studies performed on serotonergic neurons from rat raphe nuclei have shown that when these neurons are treated with lithium, serotonin release is enhanced during a depolarization compared to no lithium treatment and the same depolarization.

Lithium has a plethora of proposed molecular targets:

- Lithium both directly and indirectly inhibits GSK3β (glycogen synthase kinase 3β) which results in the activation of mTOR. This leads to an increase in neuroprotective mechanisms by facilitating the Akt signaling pathway. GSK-3β is a downstream target of monoamine systems. As such, it is directly implicated in cognition and mood regulation. During mania, GSK-3β is activated via dopamine overactivity. GSK-3β inhibits the transcription factors β-catenin and cyclic AMP (cAMP) response element binding protein (CREB), by phosphorylation. This results in a decrease in the transcription of important genes encoding for neurotrophins. Inhibition of GSK3β reverses this change.
- In addition, several authors proposed that pAp-phosphatase could be one of the therapeutic targets of lithium. This hypothesis was supported by the low K_{i} of lithium for human pAp-phosphatase compatible within the range of therapeutic concentrations of lithium in the plasma of people (0.8–1 mM). The K_{i} of human pAp-phosphatase is ten times lower than that of GSK3β (glycogen synthase kinase 3β). Inhibition of pAp-phosphatase by lithium leads to increased levels of pAp (3′–5′ phosphoadenosine phosphate), which was shown to inhibit PARP-1.
- Another mechanism proposed in 2007 is that lithium may interact with the nitric oxide (NO) signalling pathway in the central nervous system, which plays a crucial role in neural plasticity. The NO system could be involved in the antidepressant effect of lithium in the Porsolt forced swimming test in mice.
- It was also reported that NMDA receptor blockage augments antidepressant-like effects of lithium in the mouse forced swimming test, indicating the possible involvement of NMDA receptor/NO signaling in the action of lithium in this animal model of learned helplessness.

Lithium possesses neuroprotective properties by preventing apoptosis and increasing cell longevity.

Although the search for a novel lithium-specific receptor is ongoing, the high concentration of lithium compounds required to elicit a significant pharmacological effect leads mainstream researchers to believe that the existence of such a receptor is unlikely.

=== Oxidative metabolism ===
Evidence suggests that mitochondrial dysfunction is present in people with bipolar disorder. Oxidative stress and reduced levels of anti-oxidants (such as glutathione) lead to cell death. Lithium may protect against oxidative stress by up-regulating complexes I and II of the mitochondrial electron transport chain.

=== Dopamine and G-protein coupling ===
During mania, there is an increase in neurotransmission of dopamine that causes a secondary homeostatic down-regulation, resulting in decreased neurotransmission of dopamine, which can cause depression. Additionally, the post-synaptic actions of dopamine are mediated through G-protein coupled receptors. Once dopamine is coupled to the G-protein receptors, it stimulates other secondary messenger systems that modulate neurotransmission. Studies found that in autopsies (which do not necessarily reflect living people), people with bipolar disorder had increased G-protein coupling compared to people without bipolar disorder. Lithium treatment alters the function of certain subunits of the dopamine-associated G-protein, which may be part of its mechanism of action.

=== Glutamate and NMDA receptors ===
Glutamate levels are observed to be elevated during mania. Lithium is thought to provide long-term mood stabilization and have anti-manic properties by modulating glutamate levels. It is proposed that lithium competes with magnesium for binding to NMDA glutamate receptor, increasing the availability of glutamate in post-synaptic neurons, leading to a homeostatic increase in glutamate re-uptake which reduces glutamatergic transmission. The NMDA receptor is also affected by other neurotransmitters such as serotonin and dopamine. Effects observed appear exclusive to lithium and have not been observed by other monovalent ions such as rubidium and cesium.

=== GABA receptors ===
GABA is an inhibitory neurotransmitter that plays an important role in regulating dopamine and glutamate neurotransmission. It was found that people with bipolar disorder had lower GABA levels, which results in excitotoxicity and can cause apoptosis (cell loss). Lithium has been shown to increase the level of GABA in plasma and cerebral spinal fluid. Lithium counteracts these degrading processes by decreasing pro-apoptotic proteins and stimulating release of neuroprotective proteins. Lithium's regulation of both excitatory dopaminergic and glutamatergic systems through GABA may play a role in its mood-stabilizing effects.

=== Cyclic AMP secondary messengers ===
Lithium's therapeutic effects are thought to be partially attributable to its interactions with several signal transduction mechanisms. The cyclic AMP secondary messenger system is shown to be modulated by lithium. Lithium was found to increase the basal levels of cyclic AMP but impair receptor-coupled stimulation of cyclic AMP production. It is hypothesized that the dual effects of lithium are due to the inhibition of G-proteins that mediate cyclic AMP production. Over a long period of lithium treatment, cyclic AMP and adenylate cyclase levels are further changed by gene transcription factors.

=== Inositol depletion hypothesis ===
Lithium treatment has been found to inhibit the enzyme inositol monophosphatase, involved in degrading inositol monophosphate to inositol required in PIP_{2} synthesis. This leads to lower levels of inositol triphosphate, created by decomposition of PIP_{2}. This effect has been suggested to be further enhanced with an inositol triphosphate reuptake inhibitor. Inositol disruptions have been linked to memory impairment and depression. It is known with good certainty that signals from the receptors coupled to the phosphoinositide signal transduction are affected by lithium. Myo-inositol is also regulated by the high affinity sodium mI transport system (SMIT). Lithium is hypothesized to inhibit mI entering the cells and mitigate the function of SMIT. Reductions of cellular levels of myo-inositol results in the inhibition of the phosphoinositide cycle.

=== Neurotrophic factors ===
Lithium's actions on Gsk3 result in activation of CREB, leading to higher expression of BDNF. (Valproate, another mood stabilizer, also increases the expression of BDNF.) As expected of increased BDNF expression, chronic lithium treatment leads to increased grey matter volume in brain areas implicated in emotional processing and cognitive control. Bipolar patients treated with lithium also have higher white matter integrity compared to those taking other drugs.

Lithium also increases the expression of mesencephalic astrocyte-derived neurotrophic factor (MANF), another neurotrophic factor, via the AP-1 transcription factor. MANF is able to regulate proteostasis by interacting with GRP78, a protein involved in the unfolded protein response.

== History ==
=== 19th and early 20th centuries ===
Lithium was first used in the 19th century as a treatment for gout after scientists discovered that, at least in the laboratory, lithium could dissolve uric acid crystals isolated from the kidneys. The levels of lithium needed to dissolve urate in the body, however, were toxic. Because of prevalent theories linking excess uric acid to a range of disorders, including depressive and manic disorders, Carl Lange in Denmark and William Alexander Hammond in New York City used lithium to treat mania from the 1870s onwards.

By the turn of the 20th century, as theory regarding mood disorders evolved and so-called "brain gout" disappeared as a medical entity, the use of lithium in psychiatry was largely abandoned; however, several lithium preparations were still produced for the control of renal calculi and uric acid diathesis. As accumulating knowledge indicated a role for excess sodium intake in hypertension and heart disease, lithium salts were prescribed to patients for use as a replacement for dietary table salt (sodium chloride). This practice and the sale of lithium itself were both banned in the United States in February 1949, following the publication of reports detailing side effects and deaths.

=== John Cade and the discovery of lithium's effect on mania ===
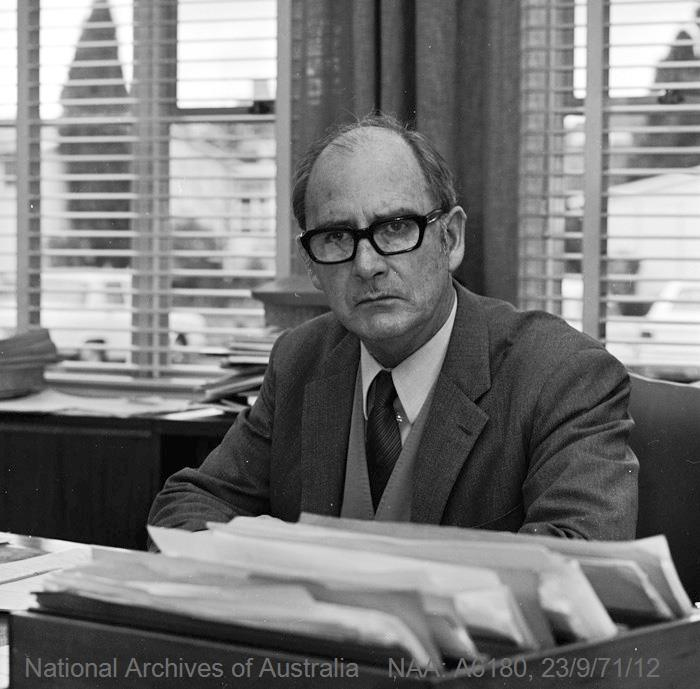
John Cade in 1971

In 1948, the Australian psychiatrist John Cade discovered the usefulness of lithium salts in treating mania while working at the Bundoora Repatriation Mental Hospital in Melbourne. He was injecting guinea pigs with urine extracts taken from manic patients in an attempt to isolate a metabolic compound which might be causing mental symptoms. Since uric acid in gout was known to be psychoactive, he needed soluble urate for a control. He used lithium urate, already known to be the most soluble urate compound, and observed that it caused the guinea pigs to become tranquil.

Cade traced the effect to the lithium ion itself, and after Cade ingested lithium himself to ensure its safety in humans, he proposed lithium salts as tranquilizers. In 1949, he published his findings in the Medical Journal of Australia in a paper entitled "Lithium salts in the treatment of psychotic excitement".

He soon succeeded in controlling mania in chronically hospitalized patients with lithium. This was one of the first successful applications of a drug to treat mental illness, and it opened the door for the development of medicines for other mental problems in the next decades. In 1950, one of Cade's first patients died of lithium toxicity after Cade had successfully treated him and released him from the hospital. Afterward, Cade abandoned the research of lithium and focused instead on testing other salts of rubidium, cerium, and strontium for their potential utility in psychiatry.

The rest of the world was slow to adopt lithium as a treatment, largely because of deaths that resulted from even relatively minor overdosing, including those reported from the use of lithium chloride as a substitute for table salt. However, other scientists had already read John Cade's 1949 article on lithium and continued their research of the effect of lithium on mania. In 1951, Edward Trautner and colleagues at the University of Melbourne followed up on Cade's 1949 research paper and used flame photometry to identify the range of lithium blood levels that are safe for patients.

By 1952 Cade was superintendent of the prestigious Royal Park Hospital in Melbourne. He prohibited the use of lithium, his own discovery, in the hospital. By 1953 he had changed his mind, and he hired biochemist Shirley Andrews to run the hospital's clinical laboratory and test the lithium levels of patients using a flame photometer. Shirley Andrews not only published research papers while at Royal Park Hospital, but also became famous for her work on Australian folk dance and Aboriginal rights activism. Shirley Andrews and John Cade were both eventually honored with the Order of Australia; Andrews for her work with Australian folk dance and Cade for his work with lithium.

=== Mogens Schou and proving lithium's efficacy ===
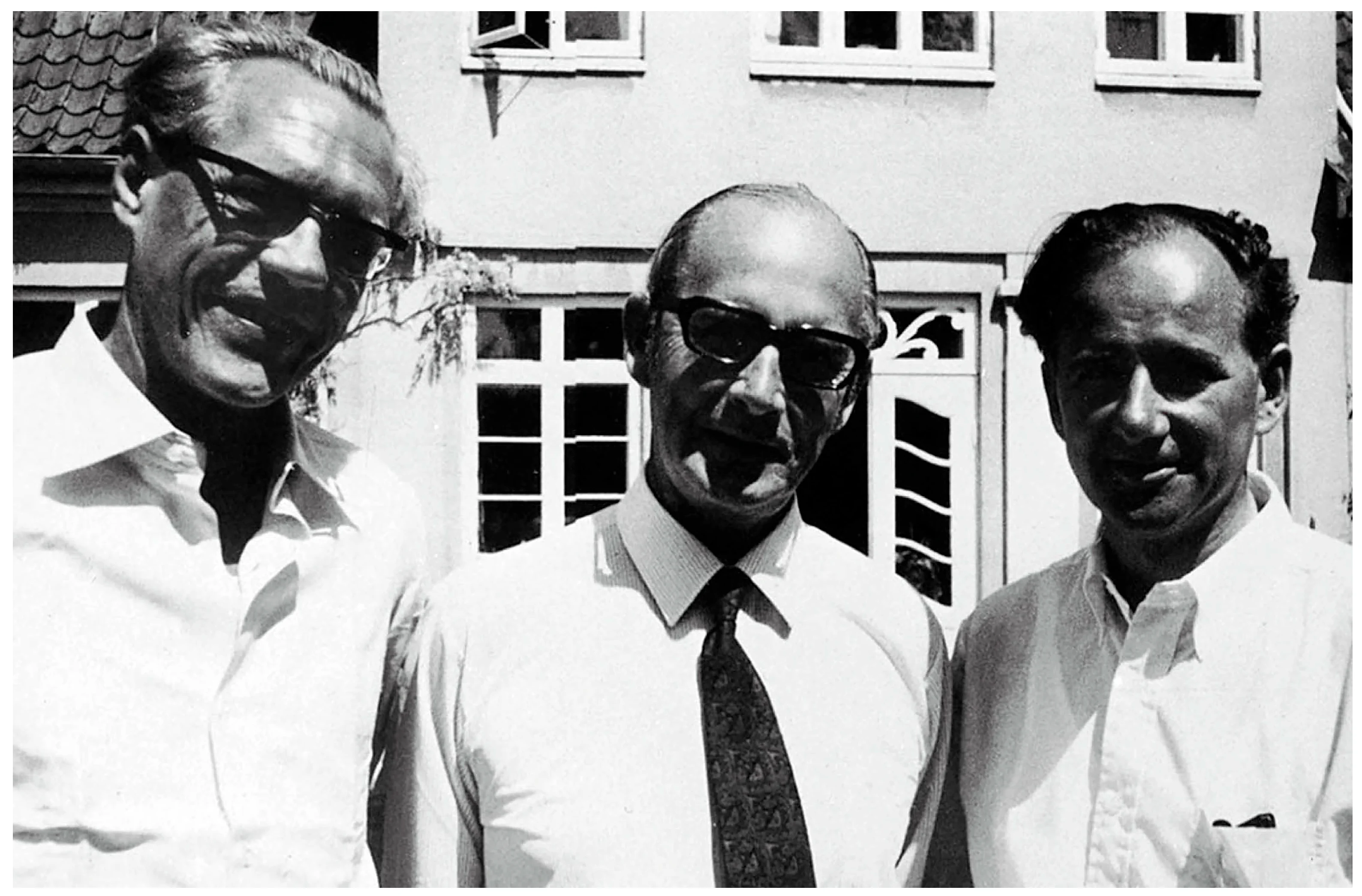
Poul Baastrup, John Cade, and Mogens Schou

In 1954, Mogens Schou of Denmark confirmed lithium's efficacy in a randomzied double-blind placebo-controlled study with his colleagues. Schou and Paul Baastrup organized other studies over the following years and decades and published a variety of research papers about lithium. At the time, lithium was a major advance. Before the advent of lithium, barbiturates were the standard treatment for mania.

However, lithium was met with great resistance by British psychiatry. To Aubrey Lewis and Michael Shepherd, from the Institute of Psychiatry at Maudsley Hospital, lithium was ‘dangerous nonsense’. Michael Shepherd and Barry Blackwell called lithium a 'therapeutic myth.' The Maudsley psychiatrists had a history of debunking ineffective medical treatments. They claimed that Schou was biased because his brother, who experienced recurrent depressions since childhood, had a dramatic response to lithium. Schou felt that it had cured him.

Largely through the research and other efforts of Mogens Schou and Paul Baastrup in Europe, and Samuel Gershon and Baron Shopsin in the U.S., resistance to lithium was slowly overcome. The American Psychiatric Association (APA) established a lithium task force chaired by Irvin M. Cohen, with members William Bunney, Jonathan Cole, Ronald R. Fieve, Samuel Gershon, Robert Prien, and Joseph Tupin. The recommendation of the lithium task force was to approve lithium. The application of lithium in manic illness was approved by the Food and Drug Administration in 1970, becoming the 50th nation to do so. Lithium is unique among medications in that it was developed by academics without pharmaceutical company sponsorship. As it is a natural element, it cannot be patented.

=== Popular culture ===
Lithium has now become a part of Western popular culture. Characters in Maude, Pi, Homeland, Premonition, Stardust Memories, American Psycho, Garden State, and An Unmarried Woman all take lithium. Lithium is the chief constituent of the calming drug in Ira Levin's dystopian novel This Perfect Day.

SiriusXM Satellite Radio in North America has a 1990s alternative rock station called Lithium, and several songs refer to the use of lithium as a mood stabilizer. These include: "Equilibrium met Lithium" by South African artist Koos Kombuis, "Lithium" by Evanescence, "Lithium" by Nirvana, "Lithium and a Lover" by Sirenia, "Lithium Sunset", from the album Mercury Falling by Sting, and "Lithium" by Thin White Rope.

=== 7 Up ===
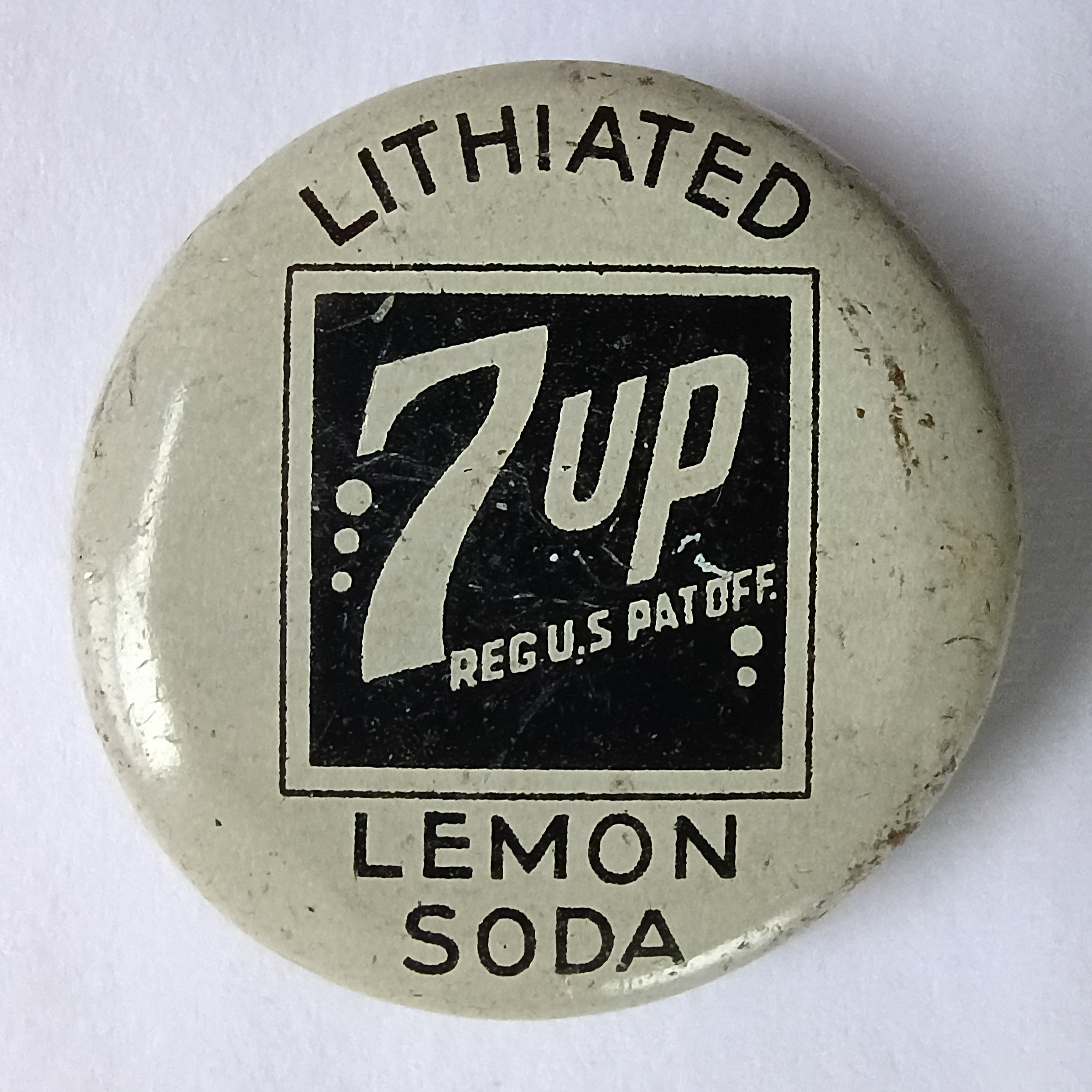
A 7Up Lithiated Lemon Soda bottle cap.

As with cocaine in Coca-Cola, lithium was widely marketed as one of several patent medicine products popular in the late 19th and early 20th centuries and was claimed to be included in many drinks including lithia water and 7 Up.

Charles Leiper Grigg, who launched his St. Louis-based company The Howdy Corporation, invented a formula for a lemon-lime soft drink in 1920. The product, at one point named "7Up Lithiated Lemon Soda", was launched two weeks before the Wall Street Crash of 1929. It claimed to contain the mood stabilizer lithium citrate, and was one of many patent medicine products popular in the late-19th and early-20th centuries. All references to lithium were removed in 1937 after it became clear that 7Up contains no lithium.

Many sources written by scientists (instead of historians) incorrectly report that 7 Up was forced to remove lithium in 1948, with an FDA action that supposedly banned lithium from beverages. Despite the supposed ban, in 1950, the Painesville Telegraph still carried an advertisement for a lithiated lemon beverage.

== Salts and product names ==
Lithium carbonate (Li_{2}CO_{3}) is the most commonly used form of lithium salts, a carbonic acid involving the lithium element and a carbonate ion. Other lithium salts are also used as medication, such as lithium citrate (Li_{3}C_{6}H_{5}O_{7}), lithium sulfate, lithium chloride, lithium ascorbate and lithium orotate. Lithium bromide was used in the late 1800s. Nanoparticles and microemulsions have also been invented as drug delivery mechanisms. As of 2020, there is a lack of evidence that alternate formulations or salts of lithium would reduce the need for monitoring serum lithium levels or lower systemic toxicity.

Forms of lithium that have been used on humans
| Name | Chemical formula | % Li by mass | Notes |
|---|---|---|---|
| Lithium carbonate | Li_{2}CO_{3} | 18.78 | Main form |
| Lithium citrate | Li_{3}C_{6}H_{5}O_{7} | 9.92 | Salt used for most liquid forms |
| Lithium sulfate | Li_{2}SO_{4} | 12.63 | |
| Lithium chloride | LiCl | 16.37 | Historical salt substitute |
| Lithium orotate | LiC_{5}H_{3}N_{2}O_{4} | 4.28 | OTC |
| Lithium aspartate | LiC_{4}H_{6}NO_{4} | 4.99 | OTC |
| Lithium succinate | Li_{2}C_{4}H_{4}O_{4} | 10.68 | Dermatological |
| Lithium lactate | C_{3}H_{5}LiO_{3} | 7.23 | Historically for gout |
| Lithium iodide | LiI | 5.18 | Radiological contrast (historical) |

As of 2017, lithium was marketed under many brand names worldwide, including Cade, Calith, Camcolit, Carbolim, Carbolit, Carbolith, Carbolithium, Carbonato de Litio, Carboron, Ceglution, Contemnol, Efadermin (Lithium and Zinc Sulfate), Efalith (Lithium and Zinc Sulfate), Elcab, Eskalit, Eskalith, Frimania, Hypnorex, Kalitium, Karlit, Lalithium, Li-Liquid, Licarb, Licarbium, Lidin, Ligilin, Lilipin, Lilitin, Limas, Limed, Liskonum, Litarex, Lithane, Litheum, Lithicarb, Lithii carbonas, Lithii citras, Lithioderm, Lithiofor, Lithionit, Lithium, Lithium aceticum, Lithium asparagicum, Lithium Carbonate, Lithium Carbonicum, Lithium Citrate, Lithium DL-asparaginat-1-Wasser, Lithium gluconicum, Lithium-D-gluconat, Lithiumcarbonaat, Lithiumcarbonat, Lithiumcitrat, Lithiun, Lithobid, Lithocent, Lithotabs, Lithuril, Litiam, Liticarb, Litijum, Litio, Litiomal, Lito, Litocarb, Litocip, Maniprex, Milithin, Neurolepsin, Plenur, Priadel, Prianil, Prolix, Psicolit, Quilonium, Quilonorm, Quilonum, Sedalit, Téralithe, and Theralite.

Lithium is available as lithium carbonate in tablets or capsules, and as lithium citrate in liquid form. In the United States, standard release tablets are available in 300 mg. Standard release capsules come in strengths of 150 mg, 300 mg, and 600 mg. Slow release tablets are available in 300 mg and 450 mg. Liquid lithium, in the form of lithium citrate, is available as an 8 mEq/5 mL solution. In the United Kingdom, lithium is available as standard release tablets of 250 mg, while slow release tablets come in 200 mg, 400 mg and 450 mg. Lithium citrate oral solution is also available.

== See also ==
- Bipolar disorder
