= Lithium orotate =

Chemical compound

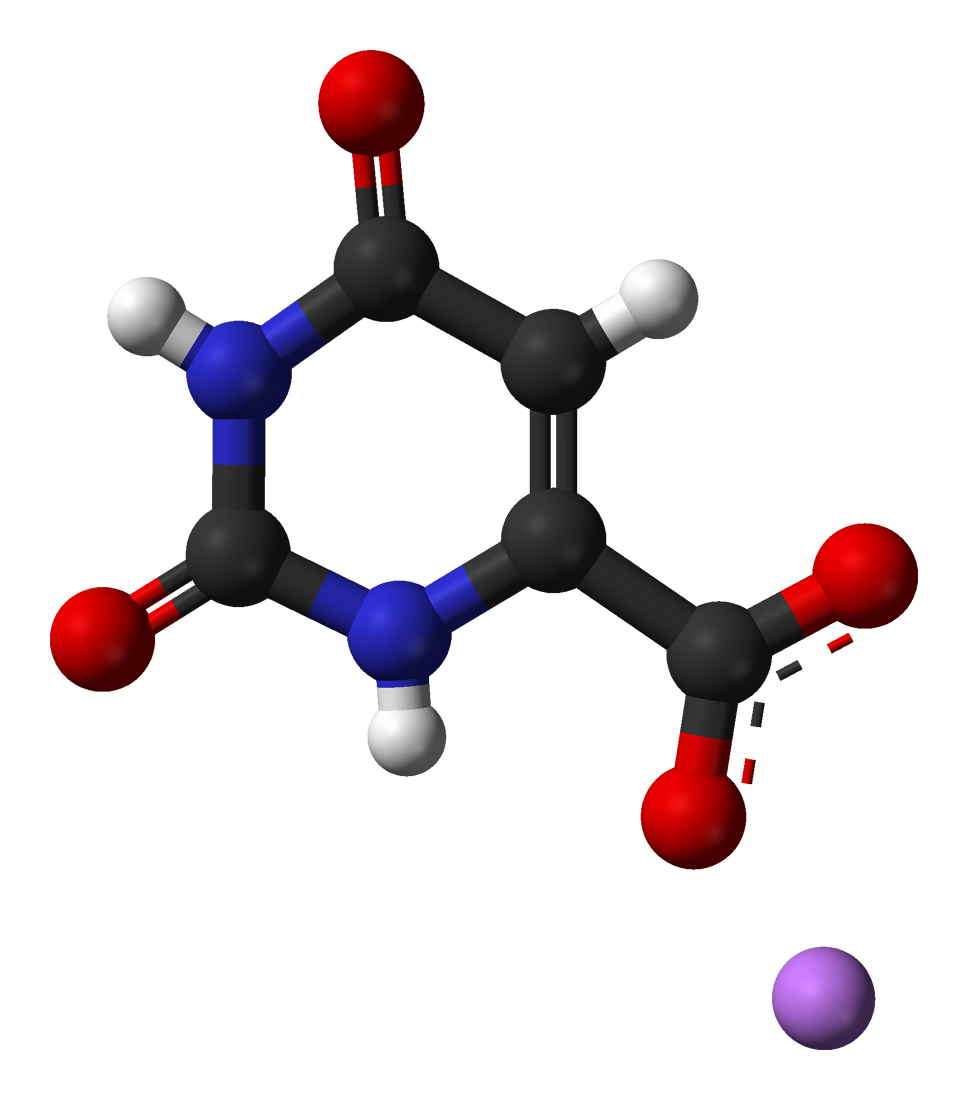

Clinical data
- AHFS/Drugs.com: Monograph
- Routes of administration: Oral

Legal status
- Legal status: In general: Over-the-counter (OTC)

Identifiers
- CAS Number: 5266-20-6
- PubChem CID: 23686432
- ChemSpider: 71254
- UNII: L2N7Z24B30
- CompTox Dashboard (EPA): DTXSID9063748
- ECHA InfoCard: 100.023.711

Chemical and physical data
- Formula: C_{5}H_{3}LiN_{2}O_{4}
- Molar mass: 162.03 g·mol^{−1}
- 3D model (JSmol): Interactive image
- SMILES: [Li+].O=C([O-])\C1=C\C(=O)NC(=O)N1
- InChI: InChI=1S/C5H4N2O4.Li/c8-3-1-2(4(9)10)6-5(11)7-3;/h1H,(H,9,10)(H2,6,7,8,11);/q;+1/p-1; Key:IZJGDPULXXNWJP-UHFFFAOYSA-M

Lithium orotate (C_{5}H_{3}LiN_{2}O_{4}) is a salt of orotic acid and lithium. It is marketed as a dietary supplement, and was studied between 1973 and 1986 as a treatment for medical conditions such as alcoholism and Alzheimer's disease.

It is available as the monohydrate, LiC_{5}H_{3}N_{2}O_{4}·H_{2}O. In this compound, lithium is non-covalently bound to an orotate ion, rather than to a carbonate or other ion, and like other salts, dissolves in solution to produce free lithium ions.

While lithium orotate is capable of providing lithium to the body, like lithium carbonate and other lithium salts, no systematic reviews support the efficacy of lithium orotate and it is not approved by the U.S. Food and Drug Administration (FDA) for the treatment of any medical condition.

== Pharmacokinetics in comparison to other lithium salts ==
In 1973, Hans Nieper reported that lithium orotate contained 3.83 mg of elemental lithium per 100 mg and lithium carbonate contained 18.8 mg of elemental lithium per 100 mg. Nieper went on to claim that lithium did not dissolve from the orotate carrier until it passed through the blood–brain barrier; however, a 1976 study documented that lithium concentrations within the brains of rats were not statistically different between equivalent dosages of lithium from lithium orotate, lithium carbonate, or lithium chloride. However, another study in 1978 showed that eight hours after intraperitoneal injections brain lithium concentrations of rats were significantly greater after lithium orotate than after lithium carbonate. While little serum lithium remained at 24 h after injection of 2·0 m equiv kg−1 lithium carbonate, two‐thirds of the 2 h serum lithium concentration was present 24 h after lithium orotate. Furthermore, the 24 h brain concentration of lithium after lithium orotate was approximately three times greater than that after lithium carbonate.

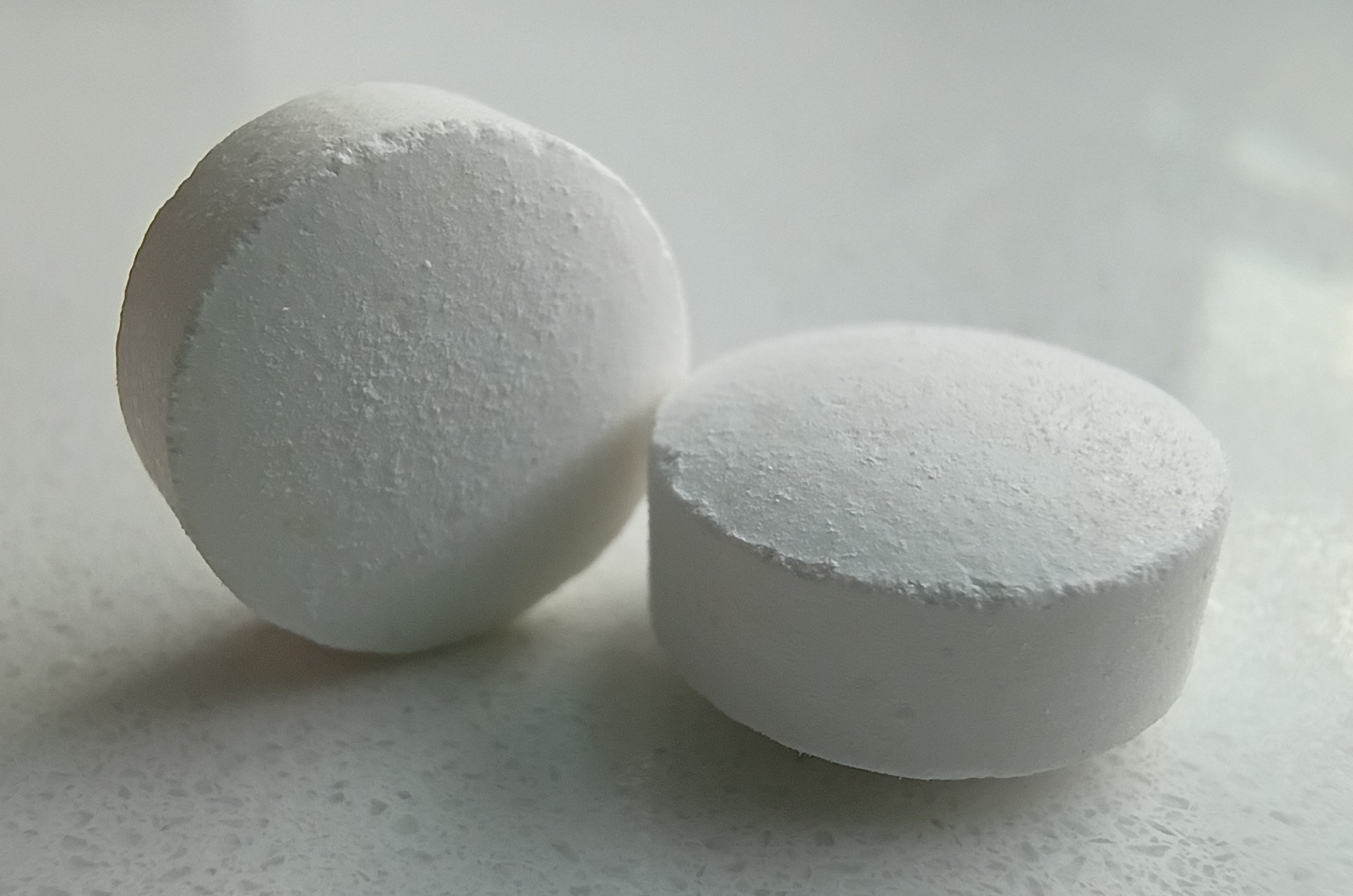
Lithium orotate 5 mg tablets

These data suggest the possibility that lower doses of lithium orotate than lithium carbonate may achieve therapeutic brain lithium concentrations and relatively stable serum concentrations. A year later, Smith and Schou repeated the experiment at a higher dose (2 mM Li^{+}) and found that the higher concentrations in the brain could be possibly accounted for by decreased renal function in rats treated with lithium orotate. The proponents of lithium orotate have since criticized the results by citing the fact that the dose of lithium orotate used in the study was in the toxic range. In 2022, Pacholko redid the experiment and showed lithium orotate to have a safer kidney profile than lithium carbonate, it also showed that both had an increased TSH only in females, but the increase was lower in the orotate group.

The pharmacokinetics of lithium orotate in human brains is poorly documented, and there is no known mechanism by which orotate ions could alter the pharmacokinetics of dissociated lithium ions, however, lithium intake appears to be effective even at low doses, and this may account for lithium orotate's claimed effectiveness.

The reason why lithium orotate is poorly studied as a medication compared to lithium carbonate is concerns raised in 1979 regarding the potential amplified renal toxicity of lithium orotate in comparison to lithium carbonate. These concerns were likely based on the results of the use of excessively high concentrations of lithium orotate in the studies. As a result of these concerns, the clinical application and research of lithium orotate were halted for decades since the 1980s. Still, interest in lithium orotate has been rekindled, and research into its use as medication was resumed in the 2010s. The renewed interest is largely due to its purported ability to achieve higher serum and brain lithium-ion (Li+) concentrations than those observed from equivalent doses of lithium carbonate, a claim first made in 1978.

Experimental measurements of solution conductivity show that lithium salts differ in this measure of ionization. Solutions of organic lithium salts exhibit significantly lower conductivity than inorganic lithium salts, and lithium orotate showed the least conductivity. This result can be interpreted to mean that in solution the lithium-orotate pair and other organic salts behave as a single species.

== Safety ==
Preliminary studies seem to indicate that lithium orotate is safe if taken at lower dosages; a 6 month alcoholism cessation study led to only minor adverse effects in 8 out of 42 patients. However, the lack of safety studies and the over-the-counter drug status raises concerns. Attention to it was specially raised in medical literature after a case report of an 18 year old woman with mild, acute lithium toxicity after taking an overdose (2.16 grams) of a lithium orotate supplement. She was discharged after treatment. Lithium blood levels 90 minutes after ingestion reached 0.31 mEq/L, and an hour later after treatment, 0.40 mEq/L, levels below the serum toxicity level of 1.5 milliequivalents per liter (mEq/L).

== Research directions ==
There is weak evidence administration of lithium orotate may be useful in aiding alcohol cessation.

== See also ==
- Lithium (medication)
- Lithium carbonate
- Lithium citrate
- Lithium aspartate
