= Irvin M. Cohen =

American psychiatrist (1922–2019)

- Born: Irvin Myron Cohen; August 29, 1922; Birmingham, AL
- Died: September 7, 2019 (aged 97); Savannah, Georgia
- Education: University of Texas, Austin; University of Texas Medical Branch at Galveston
- Spouse: Dorothy Lewis (m. 1954)
- Awards: Taylor Manor Hospital Award for Discoveries in Biological Psychiatry
- Scientific career
- Fields: Psychiatry, Psychopharmaceuticals

Irvin M. Cohen, M.D. (1922–2019) was a psychiatrist specializing in psychopharmacology, recognized for his role in the early use of chlorpromazine in the treatment of schizophrenia, the development of the first benzodiazepine (Librium) treatments in depressive patients, and in the adoption of lithium to treat bipolar disorder.

In the 1950s and 60s, Cohen implemented the clinical trials that supported the pharmacological advances in these areas, bringing to patients a new era of pharmaceuticals, many of which have remained in widespread use throughout the 2020s.

== Early life and education ==
Irvin M. Cohen was born in Birmingham, Alabama, on August 29, 1922. He attended the University of Texas at Austin (1939-1943) and the University of Texas Medical Branch at Galveston (1943-1945), before serving as a captain in the Army Medical Corps.

In 1954 he married Dorothy Lewis, one of the organizers of the psychiatric unit of the Houston Methodist Hospital, where she served as head nurse.

== Career ==
=== Psychiatry, early psychopharmaceuticals ===
Post World War II, Cohen established a private practice in Galveston, TX.

With his particular interest in psychopharmacology, he was an early proponent of the use of chlorpromazine in the treatment of schizophrenia, though he became increasingly aware of its limitations. Chlorpromazine, introduced in 1951, was seen as "more effective than any of the old drugs, including morphine," and "for psychiatrists working on the front line it was a miracle drug." But the very excitement generated by this drug suggested to Cohen that further trials were necessary.

In 1955, Cohen presented his paper, Complications of Chlorpromazine Therapy, at the 111th annual meeting of the American Psychiatric Association, reporting on his comprehensive 14 month study of dosage and usage in some 1,400 cases. Although the medication produced numerous undesirable effects and complications, overall his conclusion was that chlorpromazine was "a relatively safe drug" clinically.

=== Benzodiazepines ===
By the late 50s, the search for new psychopharmacological agents was on. Leo Sternbach, a pharmacologist working for Hoffmann-La Roche in Nutley, New Jersey, had synthesized a new molecule, chlordiazepoxide, which he felt had potential for psychopharmological therapies, but its first human study, involving high doses, produced ataxia and slurred speech. Interest in the drug diminished, until Cohen and two other clinical investigators agreed to engage in clinical trials of the drug with their psychoneurotic patients who received office-based treatment, as well as with a small number of patients in the Texas Correctional System.

Cohen's clinical trials produced impressive results. The drug, in smaller doses, had a powerful anxiolytic (anti-anxiety) action, which occurred without any accompanying clouding of consciousness or intellectual dysfunction. Toxicity was minimal, and the success of Phase III testing in thousands of patients in three settings (prison, clinic, and private office) led to its approval by the FDA in February 1960. A month later, it was marketed as Librium. The first clinical note on its therapeutic efficacy was published in the March 1960 issue of the Journal of the American Medical Association.

=== Lithium ===
Lithium's psychoactive properties had first been described in 1949 by John Cade, an Australian, with significant advances further described by Danish scientists Mogens Schou and Poul Baastrup in 1954. In the United States, research progress was delayed due to the unfortunate circumstance that six months before the publication of Cade's research, lithium salts had been approved as a "taste substitute" for table salt, "leading to a number of severe poisonings and some deaths."

In the United States, it was not until 1970 that the American Psychiatric Association Lithium Task Force of America, "William Bunney, Irvin Cohen, Jonathan Cole, Ronald Fieve, Samuel Gershon, Robert Prien, and Joseph Tupin, after repeated meetings over 2 years, advised the FDA to approve the use of lithium carbonate for the treatment of mania, and lithium officially became available in the pharmacy." These psychopharmacologists, working in New York and Galveston, established a framework for the safe dispensation of Lithium as a treatment for mood, manic episodes, and bipolar disorder. "The overall impact of lithium at this point was to revolutionize diagnosis and treatment in psychiatry." Cohen, chair of the Lithium Task Force, was a key voice here, as well as in the crafting of the Lithium Task Force's influential 1975 status report.

=== Positions of note ===
Dr. Cohen held clinical professorships at Baylor College of Medicine, University of Texas Medical School, Houston, and the University of Texas Medical Branch in Galveston. He served on the Executive Council of the Board of Houston Methodist Hospital and led several psychiatric organizations in Texas and the South.

Nationally, Cohen was a Distinguished Life Fellow of the APA, and an Emeritus Fellow of the American College of Psychiatrists. He was elected Speaker of the APA Assembly 1987-88, and served on the APA Board of Trustees and its Council on Research.

== Selected publications ==
- Complications of Chlorpromazine Therapy (1956)
- The Benzodiazepines (1970)
- The Current Status of Lithium Therapy: Report of the APA Task Force

== Honors and awards ==
- Taylor Manor Hospital Award for Discoveries in Biological Psychiatry

== Legacy ==
"The commercial context of the discovery of benzodiazepines sets them apart from other drugs of this era." In 1970, Cohen noted that benzodiazepines were “a model of how a therapeutic agent is initiated and brought forth by an enterprising pharmaceutical manufacturer who simply seeks to find a drug superior to others already in the marketplace.” Cohen regarded this as a neutral, but the commercial origins of benzodiazepines would later serve to imflate the charges that tranquilizers were created to compound corporate profits rather than to eradicate human suffering.

Cohen died September 7, 2019, in Savannah, Georgia, at the age of 97.
