= Lithium lactate =

Names
- Other names Lithium 2-hydroxypropanoate

Identifiers
CAS Number	867-55-0
3D model (JSmol)	Interactive image
ChemSpider	107852
ECHA InfoCard	100.011.602
EC Number	212-761-8
PubChem CID	24867598
CompTox Dashboard (EPA)	DTXSID00883597
- InChI: InChI=1S/C3H6O3.Li/c1-2(4)3(5)6;/h2,4H,1H3,(H,5,6);/q;+1/p-1 Key: GKQWYZBANWAFMQ-UHFFFAOYSA-M
- SMILES: [Li+].CC(C(=O)[O-])O

Properties
Chemical formula	C_{3}H_{5}LiO_{3}
Molar mass	96.01
Appearance	Amorphous solid
Density	g/cm^{3}
Melting point	300 °C (572 °F; 573 K)
Solubility in water	Very soluble

Hazards
- GHS labelling
Pictograms	(GHS07: Exclamation mark)
Signal word	Warning
Hazard statements	H315, H319, H335
Precautionary statements	P261, P264, P271, P280, P302+P352, P304+P340, P305+P351+P338, P312, P321, P332+P313, P337+P313, P362, P403+P233, P405, P501

Related compounds
Other cations	Sodium lactate
- Except where otherwise noted, data are given for materials in their standard state (at 25 °C [77 °F], 100 kPa). Infobox references

Lithium lactate is a chemical compound, a salt of lithium and lactic acid with the formula CH_{3}CH(OH)COOLi, an amorphous solid, very soluble in water.

== Synthesis ==
Synthesis is by neutralization of lactic acid with lithium hydroxide:

LiOH + CH_{3}CH(OH)COOH → CH_{3}CH(OH)COOLi + H_{2}O

== Physical properties ==
Lithium lactate forms an amorphous solid.

It dissolves very well in water and organic solvents.

The compound demonstrates optical isomerism.

Lithium lactate emits acrid smoke when heated to decomposition.

== Chemical properties ==
Lithium lactate reacts with triphosgene to obtain lactic acid-O-internal anhydride. It can be used as a precursor to prepare Li_{4}SiO_{4}, Li_{4}Ti_{5}O_{12}/C and other materials.

== Use ==
Lithium lactate is part of drugs that promote the excretion of uric acid from the body. This is linked to a historical use of lithium to help remove uric acid, but it was later shown that doses needed for it to work would be toxic.

It is also used as a mood stabilizer.
