= Lithium sulfate =

- Lithium sulfate

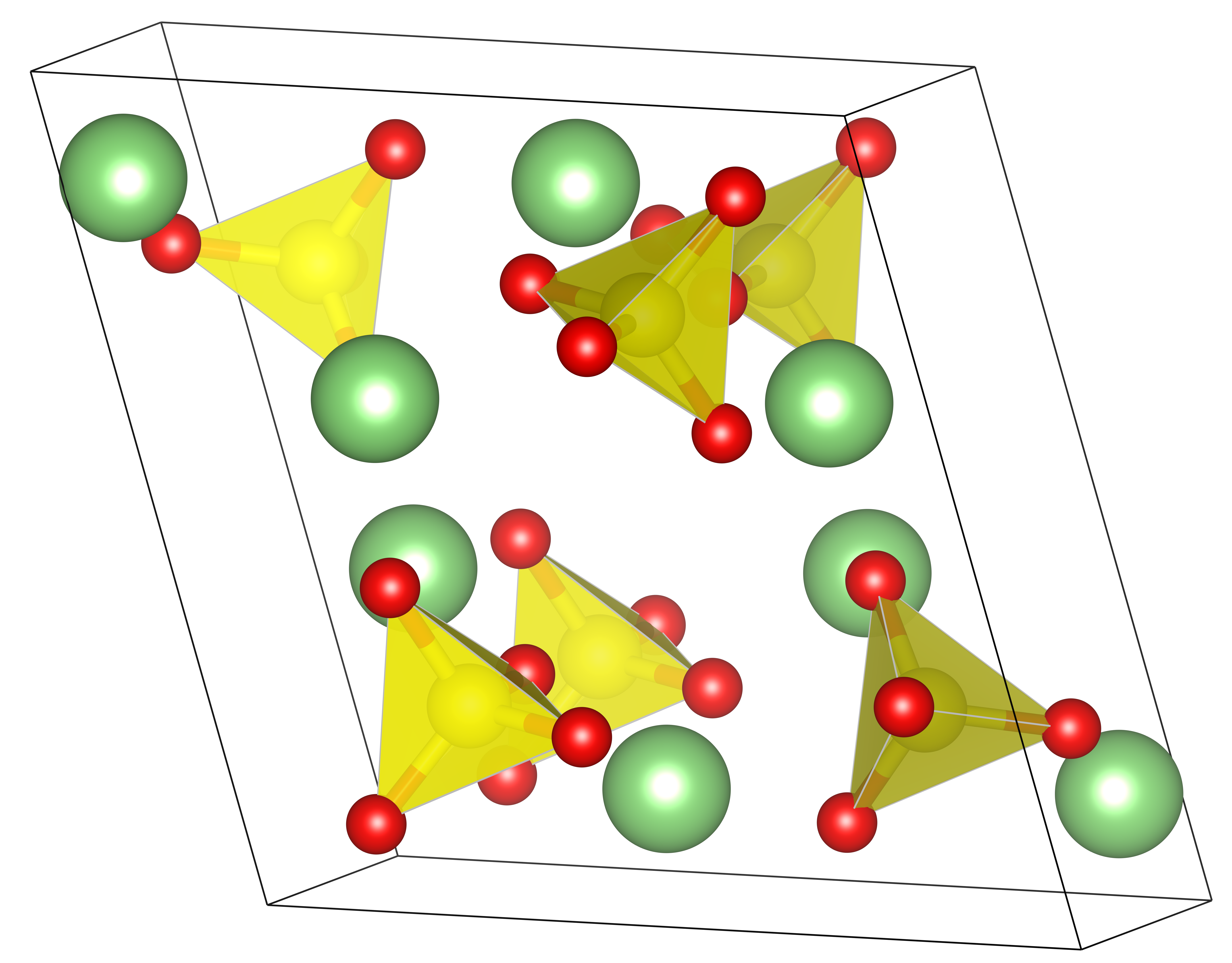
- __ Li^{+} __ S^{6+} __ O^{2−}

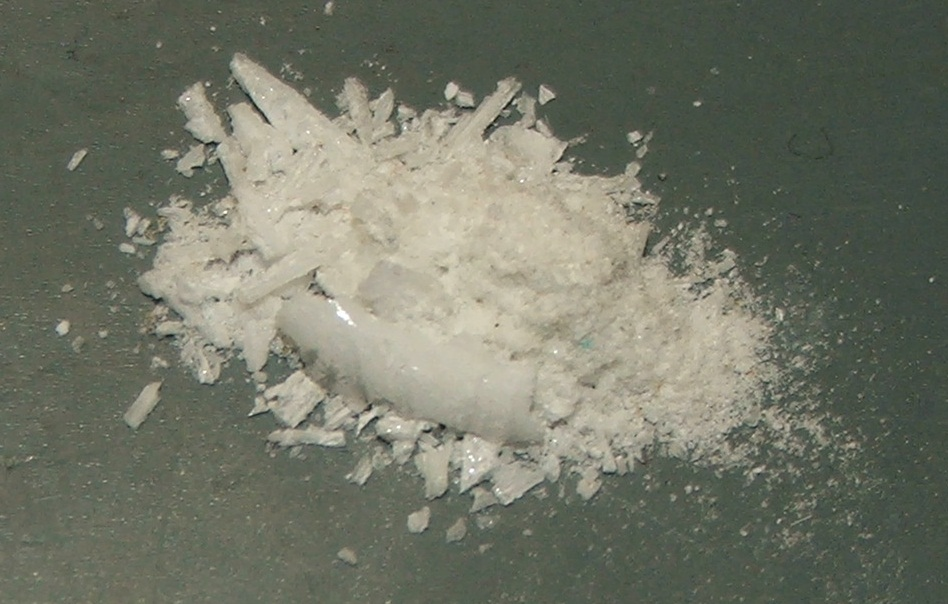

Names
- IUPAC name Lithium sulfate
- Other names Lithium sulphate

Identifiers
CAS Number	10377-48-7; 10102-25-7 (monohydrate)
3D model (JSmol)	Interactive image
ChemSpider	59698
ECHA InfoCard	100.030.734
PubChem CID	66320
RTECS number	OJ6419000
UNII	919XA137JK; KHZ7781670 (monohydrate)
CompTox Dashboard (EPA)	DTXSID3049201
- InChI: InChI=1S/2Li.H2O4S/c;;1-5(2,3)4/h;;(H2,1,2,3,4)/q2*+1;/p-2 Key: INHCSSUBVCNVSK-UHFFFAOYSA-L; InChI=1/2Li.H2O4S/c;;1-5(2,3)4/h;;(H2,1,2,3,4)/q2*+1;/p-2 Key: INHCSSUBVCNVSK-NUQVWONBAF
- SMILES: [Li+].[Li+].[O-]S(=O)(=O)[O-]

Properties
Chemical formula	Li_{2}SO_{4}
Molar mass	109.94 g/mol
Appearance	White crystalline solid, hygroscopic
Density	2.221 g/cm^{3} (anhydrous); 2.06 g/cm^{3} (monohydrate)
Melting point	859 °C (1,578 °F; 1,132 K)
Boiling point	1,377 °C (2,511 °F; 1,650 K)
Solubility in water	monohydrate: 34.9 g/100 mL (25 °C); 29.2 g/100 mL (100 °C)
Solubility	insoluble in absolute ethanol, acetone and pyridine
Magnetic susceptibility (χ)	−40.0·10^{−6} cm^{3}/mol
Refractive index (n_{D})	1.465 (β-form)

Structure
Crystal structure	Primitive monoclinic
Space group	P 2_{1}/a, No. 14
Lattice constant	a = 8.239 Å, b = 4.954 Å, c = 8.474 Å α = 90°, β = 107.98°, γ = 90°
Lattice volume (V)	328.9 Å^{3}
Formula units (Z)	4
Coordination geometry	Tetrahedral at sulfur

Thermochemistry
Heat capacity (C)	1.07 J/g K
Std molar entropy (S^{⦵}_{298})	113 J/mol K
Std enthalpy of formation (Δ_{f}H^{⦵}_{298})	−1436.37 kJ/mol
Gibbs free energy (Δ_{f}G^{⦵})	−1324.7 kJ/mol

Hazards
NFPA 704 (fire diamond)	2 0 0
- Lethal dose or concentration (LD, LC)
LD_{50} (median dose)	613 mg/kg (rat, oral)

Related compounds
Other anions	Lithium chloride
Other cations	Sodium sulfate Potassium sulfate Rubidium sulfate Caesium sulfate
- Except where otherwise noted, data are given for materials in their standard state (at 25 °C [77 °F], 100 kPa). verify (what is ?) Infobox references

Lithium sulfate is a white inorganic salt with the formula Li_{2}SO_{4}. It is the lithium salt of sulfuric acid.

== Properties ==
Laboratory derivation of Lithium Sulfate

=== Physical properties ===
Lithium sulfate is soluble in water, though it does not follow the usual trend of increasing solubility of most salts with temperature. To the contrary, its solubility in water decreases with increasing temperature, as its dissolution is an exothermic process. This relatively unusual property, also called retrograde solubility, is shared with few inorganic compounds, such as calcium hydroxide (portlandite, an important mineral phase of hydrated cement paste), the calcium sulfates (gypsum, bassanite, and anhydrite) and lanthanoid sulfates whose dissolution reactions are also exothermic. The retrograde solubility is common for gases dissolution in water, but less frequently encountered for the dissolution of solids. Calcium carbonate also exhibits a retrograde solubility, but it also depends on the behavior of CO_{2} dissolution in the calco-carbonate equilibria.

Lithium sulfate crystals, being piezoelectric, are also used in ultrasound-type non-destructive testing because they are very efficient sound receivers. However, they do suffer in this application because of their water solubility.

Since it has hygroscopic properties, the most common form of lithium sulfate is lithium sulfate monohydrate. Anhydrous lithium sulfate has a density of 2.22 g/cm^{3}; but weighing it can be cumbersome as it must be done in a water lacking atmosphere.

Lithium sulfate has pyroelectric properties. When aqueous lithium sulfate is heated, the electrical conductivity also increases. The molarity of lithium sulfate also plays a role in the electrical conductivity; optimal conductivity is achieved at 2 M and then decreases.

When solid lithium sulfate is dissolved in water it has an exothermic disassociation. This is similar to sodium sulfate which also has an exothermic disassociation. However, the exact energy of disassociation is difficult to quantify as it seems also to depend on the quantity (number of mols) of the salt added to water. Small amounts of dissolved lithium sulfate induce a much greater temperature change per mol than large amounts.

=== Crystal properties ===
Lithium sulfate has two different crystal phases. In common phase II form, Lithium sulfate has a sphenoidal monoclinic crystal system with edge lengths of a = 8.23Å b = 4.95Å c = 8.47Å β = 107.98°. When lithium sulfate is heated past 130 °C it changes to a water-free state but retains its crystal structure. It is not until 575 °C when there is a transformation from phase II to phase I. The crystal structure changes to a face centered cubic crystal system, with an edge length of 7.07Å. During this phase change, the density of lithium sulfate changes from 2.22 to 2.07 g/cm^{3}.

== Uses ==
Lithium sulfate is used to treat bipolar disorder. See lithium (medication).

Lithium sulfate is researched as a potential component of ion conducting glasses. Transparent conducting film is a highly investigated topic as it is used in applications such as solar panels and the potential for a new class of battery. In these applications, it is important to have a high lithium content; the more commonly known binary lithium borate (Li_{2}O·B_{2}O_{3}) is difficult to obtain with high lithium concentrations and difficult to keep, as it is hygroscopic. With the addition of lithium sulfate into the system, an easily produced, stable, high lithium concentration glass can be formed. Most of the current transparent ionic conducting films are made of organic plastics, and it would be ideal if an inexpensive stable inorganic glass could be developed.

Lithium sulfate has been tested as an additive for Portland cement to accelerate curing, with positive results. Lithium sulfate serves to speed up the hydration reaction (see Cement) which decreases the curing time. A concern with decreased curing time is the strength of the final product, but when tested, lithium sulfate-doped Portland cement had no observable decrease in strength.

=== Lithium-ion batteries ===
Lithium sulphate monohydrate (Li_{2}SO_{4}·H_{2}O) containing around 10% lithium is a useful chemical for the production of lithium hydroxide for the lithium-ion battery materials supply chain. It is a less reactive material than LiOH, and hence can be more easily stored and transported.

Feedstock of hard-rock spodumene concentrate is processed by acid roasting, followed by water leaching, achieving a lithium recovery of 84-88%. The purified leach solution is then evaporated, resulting in a primary lithium sulphate solid product made up mostly of lithium sulphate monohydrate (Li_{2}SO_{4}·H_{2}O).

== Medication ==
Lithium ion (Li^{+}) is used in psychiatry for the treatment of mania, endogenous depression, and psychosis, and also for treatment of schizophrenia. Usually lithium carbonate (Li_{2}CO_{3}) is applied, but sometimes lithium citrate (Li_{3}C_{6}H_{5}O_{7}), lithium sulfate or lithium oxy-butyrate are used as alternatives. Li^{+} is not metabolized. Because of Li^{+} chemical similarity to sodium (Na^{+}) and potassium (K^{+}) cations, it may interact or interfere with the biochemical pathways of these substances and displace these cations from intra- or extracellular compartments of the body. Li^{+} seems to be transported out of nerve and muscle cells by the active sodium pump, although less efficiently.

Lithium sulfate has a rapid gastrointestinal absorption rate (within a few minutes), and is complete following oral administration of tablets or the liquid form. It quickly diffuses into the liver and kidneys but requires 8–10 days to reach a body equilibrium. Li^{+} produces many metabolic and neuroendocrine changes, but no conclusive evidence favors one particular mode of action. For example, Li^{+} interacts with neurohormones, particularly the biogenic amines, serotonin (5-hydroxy tryptamine) and norepinephrine, which provides a probable mechanism for the beneficial effects in psychiatric disorders, e.g. manias. In the central nervous system (CNS), Li^{+} affects nerve excitation, synaptic transmission, and neuronalmetabolism. Li^{+} stabilizes serotonergic neurotransmission.

== Organic chemistry synthesis ==
Lithium sulfate is used as a catalyst for the elimination reaction for transforming n-butyl bromide to 1-butene, with close to 100% yield at a range of 320–370 °C. The yield of this reaction changes dramatically if heated beyond this range, as higher yields of 2-butene are formed.
