= Hans Alfred Nieper =

German physician (1928–1998)

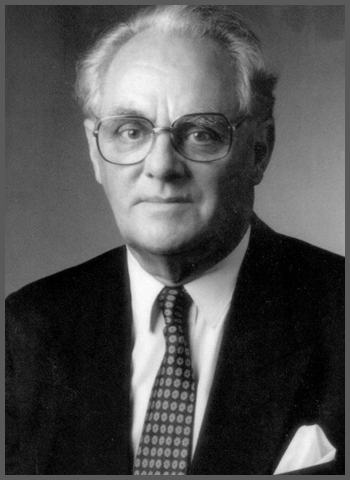
- Born: 23 May 1928; Hanover, Germany
- Died: 21 October 1998 (aged 70)
- Citizenship: German
- Education: Albert Ludwigs University of Freiburg, University of Hamburg
- Occupation: Physician
- Known for: Alternative medicine
- Medical career
- Profession: Doctor
- Field: Alternative medicine
- Institutions: Silbersee Hospital

Hans Alfred Herbert Eugen Nieper (23 May 1928 – 21 October 1998) was a controversial German alternative medicine practitioner who devised "Nieper Therapy". He claimed "Nieper Therapy" could treat cancer, multiple sclerosis, and other serious diseases. His therapy has been discredited as ineffective and unsafe.

== Early life ==
Hans Nieper was born in Hanover, Germany, on 23 May 1928.

Hans Nieper developed an interest in science and medicine early in life, influenced by his family's medical background; he later pursued a medical career.

Nieper's father was the grandson of Ferdinand Wahrendorff, founder of the Wahrendorff Psychiatric Hospitals, and son of Herbert Nieper, the chief surgeon at a Goslar hospital named for him. Nieper's parents were both doctors and married in 1925. Shortly after marriage, they both began to work at the Wahrendorff Psychiatric Hospital.

== Biography ==
Born in Germany in 1928, Nieper studied at Johann Gutenberg University and the University of Freiburg before earning a medical degree at the University of Hamburg. During his career, Nieper was director of the Department of Medicine at Silbersee Hospital in Hanover and for the German Society for Medical Tumour Treatment. Nieper was also a president of the German Society of Oncology, which promoted alternative medicine.

Nieper experimented with lithium orotate in the 1970s, proposing it as a superior means of using lithium to treat psychological disorders. At the end of the decade research into this topic stalled because of concern over kidney damage, and as of 2021 research validating such a clinical application did not exist.

With Franz Kohler, he patented calcium 2-aminoethylphosphate (calcium AEP), which he believed could treat such diseases as juvenile diabetes, gastritis, ulcer, thyroiditis, myocarditis and Hodgkin's disease. No clinical trials support these treatments. Nieper believed that cancer is rarer among sharks than other fish and theorized that the lower blood-sodium level of sharks may be an inhibitor; his approach attempted to reduce sodium in cancer patients.

With associates Dean Burk and Ernst T. Krebs, Nieper opposed fluoridation.

Nieper died at the age of 70 from a stroke.

== See also ==
- List of unproven and disproven cancer treatments
- Quackery
