= Cole Resource Center =

Mental health organization

The Cole Resource Center is a consumer to consumer mental health organization.

The Cole Resource Center was co-founded by Everett Page, Evie Barkin and Anne Whitman, Ph.D. Barkin and Whitman have publicly revealed that they have bipolar disorder, in line with the center's efforts to reduce the stigma of mental illness. It was previously located in the de Marneffe Building at McLean Hospital in Belmont, Massachusetts. Since 2021, all services have been offered remotely to clients throughout Massachusetts.

The center was named for Jonathan O. Cole, M.D., a professor of psychiatry at Harvard Medical School, and a senior consultant in psychopharmacology at McLean Hospital, and the founder of the Manic-Depressive & Depressive Association (MDDA)-Boston.

The center helped to develop news stories, including collaborations with The Wall Street Journal, Time, The Boston Globe, and the Harvard Business Review. They have contributed to television segments on psychiatric issues for the Discovery Channel, 20/20 and Good Morning America.

== See also ==
- Psychiatric survivors movement
- Recovery model
- Self-help groups for mental health
