= Lithium aspartate =

Chemical compound

Clinical data
- AHFS/Drugs.com: Monograph
- Routes of administration: Oral

Legal status
- Legal status: In general: Over-the-counter (OTC)

Identifiers
- CAS Number: 70962-88-8
- PubChem CID: 71587253
- ChemSpider: 34994320
- UNII: L2N7Z24B30
- CompTox Dashboard (EPA): DTXSID001319264

Chemical and physical data
- Formula: C_{4}H_{6}LiNO_{4}
- Molar mass: 139.04 g·mol^{−1}
- 3D model (JSmol): Interactive image
- SMILES: [Li+].N[C@@H](CC(O)=O)C([O-])=O
- InChI: InChI=InChI=1S/C4H7NO4.Li/c5-2(4(8)9)1-3(6)7;/h2H,1,5H2,(H,6,7)(H,8,9);/q;+1/p-1/t2-;/m0./s1; Key:NFNOWBZQMRFQDG-DKWTVANSSA-M

Lithium aspartate (C_{4}H_{6}LiNO_{4}) is a salt of aspartic acid and lithium. It is sometimes marketed as a dietary supplement used in small doses to treat certain medical conditions; however, there are no systematic reviews supporting the efficacy, or safety of lithium aspartate and it is not approved by the U.S. Food and Drug Administration (FDA) for the treatment of any medical condition. Published research on lithium aspartate is sparse.

Aspartic acid stimulates the NMDA receptor.

== See also ==
- Aspartic acid
- Lithium (medication)
