= Lithium toxicity =

- Other names: Lithium overdose, lithium poisoning
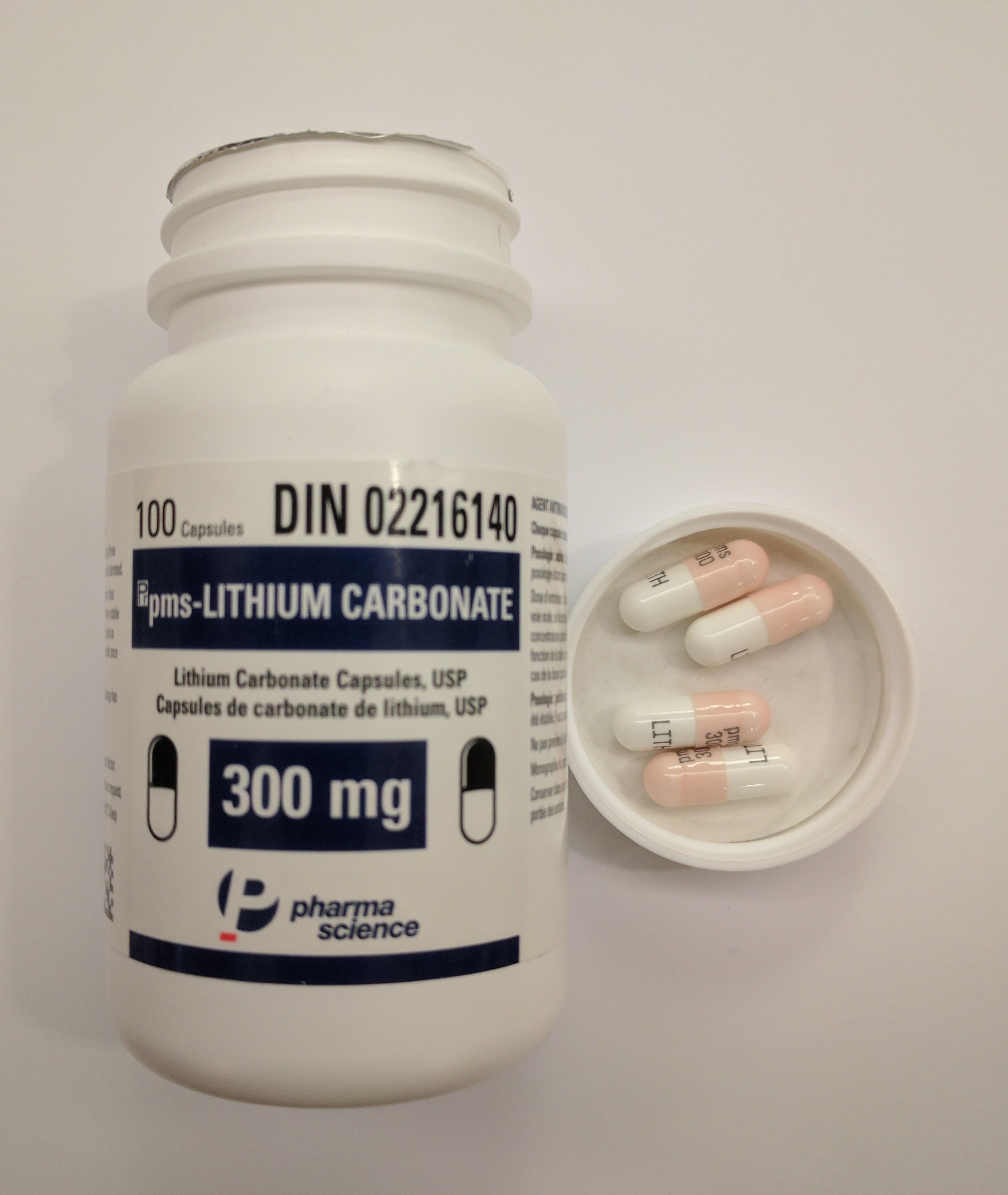
- A bottle of lithium capsules
- Specialty: Toxicology
- Symptoms: Tremor, increased reflexes, trouble walking, kidney problems, altered level of consciousness
- Complications: Serotonin syndrome, brain damage
- Types: Acute, chronic, acute on chronic
- Causes: Excessive intake, decreased excretion
- Risk factors: Dehydration, low sodium diet, kidney problems
- Diagnostic method: Based on symptoms and a lithium level
- Treatment: Gastric lavage, whole bowel irrigation, hemodialysis
- Prognosis: Low risk of death

Lithium toxicity, also known as lithium overdose, is the condition of having too much lithium. Symptoms may include a tremor, increased reflexes, trouble walking, kidney problems, and an altered level of consciousness. Some symptoms may last for a year after levels return to normal. Complications may include serotonin syndrome.

Lithium toxicity can occur due to excessive intake or decreased excretion. Excessive intake may be either a suicide attempt or accidental. Decreased excretion may occur as a result of dehydration such as from vomiting or diarrhea, a low sodium diet, or from kidney problems. The diagnosis is generally based on symptoms and supported by a lithium level in blood serum of greater than 1.2 mEq/L.

Gastric lavage and whole bowel irrigation may be useful if done early. Activated charcoal is not effective. For severe toxicity hemodialysis is recommended. The risk of death is generally low. Acute toxicity generally has better outcomes than chronic toxicity. In the United States about 5,000 cases are reported to poison control centers a year. Lithium toxicity was first described in 1898.

== Signs and symptoms ==
Symptoms of lithium toxicity can be mild, moderate, or severe.

Mild symptoms include nausea, feeling tired, and tremor occur at a level of 1.5 to 2.5 mEq/L in blood serum. Moderate symptoms include confusion, an increased heart rate, and hypertonia occur at a level of 2.5 to 3.5 mEq/L. Severe symptoms include coma, seizures, low blood pressure and increased body temperature which occur at a lithium concentration greater than 3.5 mEq/L. When lithium overdoses produce neurological deficits or cardiac toxicity, the symptoms are considered serious and can be fatal.

=== Acute toxicity ===
In acute toxicity, people have primarily gastrointestinal symptoms such as vomiting and diarrhea, which may result in volume depletion. During acute toxicity, lithium distributes later into the central nervous system causing dizziness and other mild neurological symptoms.

=== Chronic toxicity ===
In chronic toxicity, people have primarily neurological symptoms which include nystagmus, tremor, hyperreflexia, ataxia, and change in mental status. During chronic toxicity, the gastrointestinal symptoms seen in acute toxicity are less prominent. The symptoms are often vague and nonspecific.

=== Acute on chronic toxicity ===
In acute on chronic toxicity, people have symptoms of both acute and chronic toxicity.

=== Complications ===
People who survive an intoxication episode may develop persistent health problems. This group of persistent health symptoms are called syndrome of irreversible lithium-effectuated neurotoxicity (SILENT). The syndrome presents with irreversible neurological and neuro-psychiatric effects. The neurological signs are cerebellar dysfunction, extrapyramidal symptoms, and brainstem dysfunction. The neuro-psychiatric findings present with memory deficits, cognitive deficits, and sub-cortical dementia. For a diagnosis, the syndrome requires the absence of prior symptoms and persistence of symptoms for greater than 2 months after cessation of lithium.

== Pathophysiology ==
Lithium is readily absorbed from the gastrointestinal tract. It is distributed to the body with higher levels in the kidney, thyroid, and bone as compared to other tissues. Since lithium is almost exclusively excreted by the kidneys, people with preexisting chronic kidney disease are at high risk of developing lithium intoxication. The drug itself is also known to be nephrotoxic, opening up the possibility of spontaneous emergence of toxicity at doses that were previously well-tolerated. Lithium toxicity can be mistaken for other syndromes associated with antipsychotic use, such as serotonin syndrome because lithium increases serotonin metabolites in the cerebrospinal fluid.

There are several drug interactions with lithium. Interactions can occur from typical antipsychotics or atypical antipsychotics. In particular, certain drugs enhance lithium levels by increasing renal re-absorption at the proximal tubule. These drugs are angiotensin-converting enzyme inhibitors, non-steroidal anti-inflammatory drugs and thiazide diuretics.

== Diagnosis ==
The diagnosis is generally based on symptoms and supported by a lithium level blood level. Blood levels are most useful six to twelve hours after the last dose. The normal blood serum lithium level in those on treatment is between 0.6 and 1.2 mEq/L. Some blood tubes contain lithium heparin which may result in falsely elevated results.

When lithium toxicity is suspected tests may include:

- fingerstick glucose
- serum lithium concentration
- basic metabolic panel to assess renal function
- serum acetaminophen and salicylate concentrations to rule out other sources of acute ingestion
- urine pregnancy tests to ensure management does not cause abortion

Imaging tests are not helpful.

== Treatment ==
If the person's lithium toxicity is mild or moderate, lithium dosage is reduced or stopped entirely. If the toxicity is severe, lithium may need to be removed from the body. The removal of lithium is done in a hospital emergency department. It may involve:

- Gastric lavage. A tube is placed through the nose or mouth into the stomach. The tube is used to remove lithium that has not been digested yet. It may also be used to put medicines directly into the stomach to help stop lithium from being absorbed.
- Use of an artificial kidney to clean the blood (dialysis). This is usually done only in the most severe cases.
- Diuretic medications such as furosemide and hydration via intravenous normal saline appear to be effective in speeding the removal of lithium and also rehydrate patients who've lost fluids.
- Hemodialysis. Hemodialysis is widely advocated as a means of reducing the risk of permanent neurological sequelae following lithium poisoning. Although hemodialysis clearly enhances the elimination of lithium, it is unclear whether this translates into improved patient outcomes.

== See also ==
- Biology and pharmacology of chemical elements
- Diabetes insipidus
- Lithium (medication)
