= William E. Bunney =

American neuroscientist

William E. Bunney is an American neuroscientist focused on discovering the genes that cause major depressive disorder, schizophrenia, and bipolar disorder. He is a Distinguished Professor with the Department of Psychiatry and Human Behavior and the Della Martin Chair of Psychiatry at the University of California, Irvine School of Medicine. He is also the director of the UC Irvine node of the Pritzker Neuropsychiatric Disorders Research Consortium.

He is a Lifetime National Associate of the Institute of Medicine of the National Academy of Sciences.
