= Jonathan Cole (psychiatrist) =

American psychiatrist

Jonathan Otis Cole was an American psychiatrist and the former chief of psychopharmacology at McLean Hospital. He was considered to be the “father of clinical psychopharmacology in the United States [...] internationally known for his breakthrough research on the use of drugs to treat psychiatric illnesses.”

The Cole Resource Center at McLean Hospital is named in his honor and he was the founder of the Manic-Depressive & Depressive Association (MDDA)-Boston.

Cole, the first director of the psychopharmacology research branch at the National Institute of Mental Health, died May 26, 2009, due to renal disease complications in Boston.

== Early life ==
Cole's father, Arthur Harrison Cole, taught economics at Harvard University. He graduated from Milton Academy in 1942 before enrolling at Harvard College. In 1944, he enrolled at Cornell University Medical College in New York.

== Career ==
Cole was head of the NIMH Psychopharmacology Service Center for a decade where he “mounted a national collaborative evaluation of the efficacy of new drugs... (which) provided a prototype, a model for subsequent NIMH collaborative evaluations of the new classes of drugs: lithium as a treatment for mania, tricyclic antidepressants for depression, and the benzodiazepines for anxiety disorders. For that landmark study, Jonathan's group received psychiatry's Hofheimer award, their most prestigious award for scientific accomplishment.”

From 1967 until 1973, he was a psychiatrist and Superintendent at the Boston State Hospital.

Cole was a founder and one of the early Presidents of the American College of Neuropsychopharmacology (ACNP) and in 1965, receiving their first Paul Hoch Distinguished Service Award. He was secretary of the International College of Neuropsychopharmacology (CINP) from 1966 until 1969 and was awarded the CINP, Pioneers in Psychopharmacology Award in 2002.
