= Lithium citrate =

Chemical used in psychiatric treatment

Names
- Other names Trilithium citrate trilithium 2-hydroxypropane-1,2,3-tricarboxylate

Identifiers
CAS Number	919-16-4
3D model (JSmol)	Interactive image
ChEBI	CHEBI:64735
ChEMBL	ChEMBL1201170
ChemSpider	12932
DrugBank	DB14507
ECHA InfoCard	100.011.860
EC Number	213-045-8
PubChem CID	13520
RTECS number	TZ8616000
UNII	3655633623
CompTox Dashboard (EPA)	DTXSID70883185
- InChI: InChI=1S/C6H8O7.3Li/c7-3(8)1-6(13,5(11)12)2-4(9)10;;;/h13H,1-2H2,(H,7,8)(H,9,10)(H,11,12);;;/q;3*+1/p-3 Key: WJSIUCDMWSDDCE-UHFFFAOYSA-K; InChI=1/C6H8O7.3Li/c7-3(8)1-6(13,5(11)12)2-4(9)10;;;/h13H,1-2H2,(H,7,8)(H,9,10)(H,11,12);;;/q;3*+1/p-3 Key: WJSIUCDMWSDDCE-DFZHHIFOAV
- SMILES: [Li+].[Li+].[Li+].O=C([O-])CC(O)(C([O-])=O)CC(=O)[O-]

Properties
Chemical formula	Li_{3}C_{6}H_{5}O_{7}
Molar mass	209.923 g mol^{−1}
Appearance	Odorless white powder
Melting point	decomposes at 105 °C (221 °F; 378 K)

Hazards
- GHS labelling
Pictograms	(GHS07: Exclamation mark)
Signal word	Warning
Hazard statements	H302, H319
Precautionary statements	P305+P351+P338
Flash point	N/A
- Except where otherwise noted, data are given for materials in their standard state (at 25 °C [77 °F], 100 kPa). verify (what is ?) Infobox references

Lithium citrate (Li_{3}C_{6}H_{5}O_{7}) is a lithium salt of citric acid that is used as a mood stabilizer in psychiatric treatment of manic states and bipolar disorder. There is extensive pharmacology of lithium, the active component of this salt.

Lithium citrate is used to treat mania, hypomania, depression and bipolar disorder. It can be administered orally in the form of a syrup. Liquid lithium, in the form of lithium citrate, is available as an 8 mEq/5 mL solution in the United States.

== History ==
Lithium citrate was one of the lithium salts used to add lithium to drinks and water (lithia water) in the late 19th century and the early 20th century, when there was a general health craze for lithium with it believed to be a cure-all. The soft drink 7Up was at one point named "7Up Lithiated Lemon Soda" when it was formulated in 1929 because it claimed to contain lithium citrate. The beverage was a patent medicine marketed as a cure for hangover. In 1936 the United States federal government forced the manufacturer to remove a number of health claims, and because "lithium was not an actual ingredient", the name was changed to just "7 Up" in 1937. Many sources repeat an incorrect version of the story where the name is "Bib-Label Lithiated Lemon-Lime Soda" and the removal happened in 1948 due to a Food and Drug Administration ban.
