= Classification of mental disorders =

The classification of mental disorders, also known as psychiatric nosology or psychiatric taxonomy, is central to the practice of psychiatry and other mental health professions.

The two most widely used psychiatric classification systems are the International Classification of Diseases, 11th edition (ICD-11; in effect since 1 January 2022.), produced by the World Health Organization (WHO); and the Diagnostic and Statistical Manual of Mental Disorders produced by the American Psychiatric Association since 1952. The latest edition is the Fifth Edition, Text Revision (DSM-5-TR), which was released in 2022. The ICD is a broad medical classification system; mental disorders are contained in Chapter 06: Mental, behavioural or neurodevelopmental disorders (06).

Both systems list disorders thought to be distinct types, and in recent revisions the two systems have deliberately converged their codes so that their manuals are often broadly comparable, though differences remain. Both classifications employ operational definitions.

Other classification schemes, used more locally, include the Chinese Classification of Mental Disorders.

Manuals of limited use, by practitioners with alternative theoretical persuasions, include the Psychodynamic Diagnostic Manual.

== Definitions ==
In the scientific and academic literature on the definition or categorization of mental disorders, one extreme argues that it is entirely a matter of value judgments (including of what is normal) while another proposes that it is or could be entirely objective and scientific (including by reference to statistical norms); other views argue that the concept refers to a "fuzzy prototype" that can never be precisely defined, or that the definition will always involve a mixture of scientific facts (e.g. that a natural or evolved function is not working properly) and value judgments (e.g. that it is harmful or undesired). Lay concepts of mental disorder vary considerably across different cultures and countries, and may refer to different sorts of individual and social problems.

The WHO and national surveys report that there is no single consensus on the definition of mental disorder, and that the phrasing used depends on the social, cultural, economic and legal context in different contexts and in different societies. The WHO reports that there is intense debate about which conditions should be included under the concept of mental disorder; a broad definition can cover mental illness, intellectual disability, personality disorder and substance dependence, but inclusion varies by country and is reported to be a complex and debated issue. There may be a criterion that a condition should not be expected to occur as part of a person's usual culture or religion. However, despite the term "mental", there is not necessarily a clear distinction drawn between mental (dys)functioning and brain (dys)functioning, or indeed between the brain and the rest of the body.

Most international clinical documents avoid the term "mental illness", preferring the term "mental disorder". However, some use "mental illness" as the main overarching term to encompass mental disorders. Some consumer/survivor movement organizations oppose use of the term "mental illness" on the grounds that it supports the dominance of a medical model. The term "serious mental impairment" (SMI) is sometimes used to refer to more severe and long-lasting disorders while "mental health problems" may be used as a broader term, or to refer only to milder or more transient issues. Confusion often surrounds the ways and contexts in which these terms are used.

Mental disorders are generally classified separately to neurological disorders, learning disabilities or intellectual disabilities.

== Classification systems ==
=== ICD-10 ===
The International Classification of Diseases (ICD) is an international standard diagnostic classification for a wide variety of health conditions. The ICD-10 states that mental disorder is "not an exact term", although it is generally used "...to imply the existence of a clinically recognisable set of symptoms or behaviours associated in most cases with distress and with interference with personal functions." Chapter V focuses on "mental and behavioural disorders" and consists of 10 main groups:

- F0 – F9: Organic, including symptomatic mental disorders
- F10 – F-19: Mental and behavioural disorders due to use of psychoactive substances
- F20 – F29: Schizophrenia, schizotypal and delusional disorders
- F30 – F39: Mood (affective) disorders
- F40 – F49: Neurotic, stress-related and somatoform disorders
- F50 – F59: Behavioural syndromes associated with physiological disturbances and physical factors
- F60 – F69: Disorders of personality and behaviour in adult persons
- F70 – F79: Mental retardation
- F80 – F89: Disorders of psychological development
- F90 – 98: Behavioural and emotional disorders with onset usually occurring in childhood and adolescence
- In addition, a group of F99 "unspecified mental disorders".

Within each group, there are more specific subcategories.

=== ICD-11 ===
The WHO has revised ICD-10 to produce the latest version, ICD-11, adopted by the 72nd World Health Assembly in 2019, and came into effect on 1 January 2022. The ICD is a broad medical classification system; mental disorders are contained in Chapter 06: Mental, behavioural or neurodevelopmental disorders (06).

=== DSM-IV ===
The DSM-IV was originally published in 1994 and listed more than 250 mental disorders. It was produced by the American Psychiatric Association and it characterizes mental disorder as "a clinically significant behavioral or psychological syndrome or pattern that occurs in an individual,...is associated with present distress...or disability...or with a significantly increased risk of suffering" but that "...no definition adequately specifies precise boundaries for the concept of 'mental disorder'...different situations call for different definitions" (APA, 1994 and 2000). The DSM also states that "there is no assumption that each category of mental disorder is a completely discrete entity with absolute boundaries dividing it from other mental disorders or no mental disorders."

The DSM-IV-TR (Text Revision, 2000) consisted of five axes (domains) on which disorders could be assessed. The five axes were:

Axis I: Clinical Disorders (all mental disorders except Personality Disorders and Mental Retardation)
Axis II: Personality Disorders and Mental Retardation
Axis III: General Medical Conditions (must be connected to a Mental Disorder)
Axis IV: Psychosocial and Environmental Problems (for example, limited social support network)
Axis V: Global Assessment of Functioning (Psychological, social and job-related functions are evaluated on a continuum between mental health and extreme mental disorder)

The axis classification system was removed in the DSM-5 and is now mostly of historical significance. The main categories of disorder in the DSM are:

DSM Group	Examples
Disorders usually first diagnosed in infancy, childhood or adolescence. *Disorders such as ADHD and epilepsy have also been referred to as developmental disorders and developmental disabilities.	ADHD
Delirium, dementia, and amnesia and other cognitive disorders	Alzheimer's disease
Mental disorders due to a general medical condition	AIDS-related psychosis
Substance-related disorders	Alcohol use disorder
Schizophrenia and other psychotic disorders	Delusional disorder
Mood disorders	Major depressive disorder, Bipolar disorder
Anxiety disorders	Generalized anxiety disorder, Social anxiety disorder
Somatoform disorders	Somatization disorder
Factitious disorders	Münchausen syndrome
Dissociative disorders	Dissociative identity disorder
Sexual and gender dysphoria	Dyspareunia, Gender dysphoria
Eating disorders	Anorexia nervosa, Bulimia nervosa
Sleep disorders	Insomnia
Impulse control disorders not elsewhere classified	Kleptomania
Adjustment disorders	Adjustment disorder
Personality disorders	Narcissistic personality disorder
Other conditions that may be a focus of clinical attention	Tardive dyskinesia, Child abuse

=== DSM-5 ===
The Diagnostic and Statistical Manual of Mental Disorders, Fifth Edition (DSM-5) is the 2013 update to the Diagnostic and Statistical Manual of Mental Disorders, the taxonomic and diagnostic tool published by the American Psychiatric Association (APA). In 2022, a revised version (DSM-5-TR) was published. In the United States, the DSM serves as the principal authority for psychiatric diagnoses.

The DSM-5 is not a major revision of the DSM-IV-TR, but the two have significant differences. Changes in the DSM-5 include the re-conceptualization of Asperger syndrome from a distinct disorder into autism spectrum disorder; the elimination of subtypes of schizophrenia; the deletion of the "bereavement exclusion" for depressive disorders; the renaming and reconceptualization of gender identity disorder to gender dysphoria; the inclusion of binge eating disorder as a discrete eating disorder; the renaming and reconceptualization of paraphilias, now called paraphilic disorders; the removal of the five-axis system; and the splitting of disorders not otherwise specified into other specified disorders and unspecified disorders.

== Other schemes ==
- The Chinese Society of Psychiatry's Chinese Classification of Mental Disorders (currently CCMD-3)
- The Latin American Guide for Psychiatric Diagnosis (GLDP).
- The Research Domain Criteria (RDoC), a framework being developed by the National Institute of Mental Health
- The Hierarchical Taxonomy of Psychopathology (HiTOP), developed by the HiTOP consortium, a group of psychologists and psychiatrists who had a record of scientific contributions to classification of psychopathology.

== Childhood diagnosis ==
Child and adolescent psychiatry sometimes uses specific manuals in addition to the DSM and ICD. The Diagnostic Classification of Mental Health and Developmental Disorders of Infancy and Early Childhood (DC:0-3) was first published in 1994 by Zero to Three to classify mental health and developmental disorders in the first four years of life. It has been published in 9 languages. The Research Diagnostic criteria-Preschool Age (RDC-PA) was developed between 2000 and 2002 by a task force of independent investigators with the goal of developing clearly specified diagnostic criteria to facilitate research on psychopathology in this age group. The French Classification of Child and Adolescent Mental Disorders (CFTMEA), operational since 1983, is the classification of reference for French child psychiatrists.

== Usage ==
The ICD and DSM classification schemes have achieved widespread acceptance in psychiatry. A survey of 205 psychiatrists, from 66 countries across all continents, found that ICD-10 was more frequently used and more valued in clinical practice and training, while the DSM-IV was more frequently used in clinical practice in the United States and Canada, and was more valued for research, with accessibility to either being limited, and usage by other mental health professionals, policy makers, patients and families less clear. A primary care (e.g. general or family physician) version of the mental disorder section of ICD-10 has been developed (ICD-10-PHC) which has also been used quite extensively internationally. A survey of journal articles indexed in various biomedical databases between 1980 and 2005 indicated that 15,743 referred to the DSM and 3,106 to the ICD.

In Japan, most university hospitals use either the ICD or DSM. ICD appears to be somewhat more used for research or academic purposes, while both were used equally for clinical purposes. Other traditional psychiatric schemes may also be used.

== Types of classification schemes ==
=== Categorical schemes ===
The classification schemes in common usage are based on separate (but may be overlapping) categories of disorder schemes sometimes termed "neo-Kraepelinian" (after the psychiatrist Kraepelin) which is intended to be atheoretical with regard to etiology (causation). These classification schemes have achieved some widespread acceptance in psychiatry and other fields, and have generally been found to have improved inter-rater reliability, although routine clinical usage is less clear. Questions of validity and utility have been raised, both scientifically and in terms of social, economic and political factors—notably over the inclusion of certain controversial categories, the influence of the pharmaceutical industry, or the stigmatizing effect of being categorized or labelled.

=== Non-categorical schemes ===
Some approaches to classification do not use categories with single cut-offs separating the ill from the healthy or the abnormal from the normal (a practice sometimes termed "threshold psychiatry" or "dichotomous classification").

Classification may instead be based on broader underlying "spectra", where each spectrum links together a range of related categorical diagnoses and nonthreshold symptom patterns.

Some approaches go further and propose continuously varying dimensions that are not grouped into spectra or categories; each individual simply has a profile of scores across different dimensions. DSM-5 planning committees are currently seeking to establish a research basis for a hybrid dimensional classification of personality disorders. However, the problem with entirely dimensional classifications is they are said to be of limited practical value in clinical practice where yes/no decisions often need to be made, for example whether a person requires treatment, and moreover the rest of medicine is firmly committed to categories, which are assumed to reflect discrete disease entities. While the Psychodynamic Diagnostic Manual has an emphasis on dimensionality and the context of mental problems, it has been structured largely as an adjunct to the categories of the DSM. Moreover, dimensionality approach was criticized for its reliance on independent dimensions whereas all systems of behavioral regulations show strong inter-dependence, feedback and contingent relationships

=== Descriptive vs Somatic ===
Descriptive classifications are based almost exclusively on either descriptions of behavior as reported by various observers, such as parents, teachers, and medical personnel; or symptoms as reported by individuals themselves. As such, they are quite subjective, not amenable to verification by third parties, and not readily transferable across chronologic and/or cultural barriers.

Somatic nosology, on the other hand, is based almost exclusively on the objective histologic and chemical abnormalities which are characteristic of various diseases and can be identified by appropriately trained pathologists. While not all pathologists will agree in all cases, the degree of uniformity allowed is orders of magnitude greater than that enabled by the constantly changing classification embraced by the DSM system. Some models, like Functional Ensemble of Temperament suggest to unify nosology of somatic, biologically based individual differences in healthy people (temperament) and their deviations in a form of mental disorders in one taxonomy.

== Cultural differences ==
Classification schemes may not apply to all cultures. The DSM is based on predominantly American research studies and has been said to have a decidedly American outlook, meaning that differing disorders or concepts of illness from other cultures (including personalistic rather than naturalistic explanations) may be neglected or misrepresented, while Western cultural phenomena may be taken as universal. Culture-bound syndromes are those hypothesized to be specific to certain cultures (typically taken to mean non-Western or non-mainstream cultures); while some are listed in an appendix of the DSM-IV they are not detailed and there remain open questions about the relationship between Western and non-Western diagnostic categories and sociocultural factors, which are addressed from different directions by, for example, cross-cultural psychiatry or anthropology.

== Historical development ==
=== Antiquity ===
In Ancient Greece, Hippocrates and his followers are generally credited with the first classification system for mental illnesses, including mania, melancholia, phrenitis, insanity, paranoia, panic, epilepsy and hysteria. They held that they were due to different kinds of imbalance in four humors. many of these terms are still used in modern psychiatric and neurological practice

=== Middle ages to Renaissance ===
The Persian physicians 'Ali ibn al-'Abbas al-Majusi and Najib ad-Din Samarqandi elaborated upon Hippocrates' system of classification. Avicenna (980−1037 CE) in the Canon of Medicine listed a number of mental disorders, including "passive male homosexuality".

Laws generally distinguished between "idiots" and "lunatics".

Thomas Sydenham (1624–1689), the "English Hippocrates", emphasized careful clinical observation and diagnosis and developed the concept of a syndrome, a group of associated symptoms having a common course, which would later influence psychiatric classification.

=== 18th century ===
Evolution in the scientific concepts of psychopathology (literally referring to diseases of the mind) took hold in the late 18th and 19th centuries following the Renaissance and Enlightenment. Individual behaviors that had long been recognized came to be grouped into syndromes.

Boissier de Sauvages developed an extremely extensive psychiatric classification in the mid-18th century, influenced by the medical nosology of Thomas Sydenham and the biological taxonomy of Carl Linnaeus. It was only part of his classification of 2400 medical diseases. These were divided into 10 "classes", one of which comprised the bulk of the mental diseases, divided into four "orders" and 23 "genera". One genus, melancholia, was subdivided into 14 "species".

William Cullen advanced an influential medical nosology which included four classes of neuroses: coma, adynamias, spasms, and vesanias. The vesanias included amentia, melancholia, mania, and oneirodynia.

Towards the end of the 18th century and into the 19th, Pinel, influenced by Cullen's scheme, developed his own, again employing the terminology of genera and species. His simplified revision of this reduced all mental illnesses to four basic types. He argued that mental disorders are not separate entities but stem from a single disease that he called "mental alienation".

Attempts were made to merge the ancient concept of delirium with that of insanity, the latter sometimes described as delirium without fever.

On the other hand, Pinel had started a trend for diagnosing forms of insanity 'without delirium' (meaning hallucinations or delusions) – a concept of partial insanity. Attempts were made to distinguish this from total insanity by criteria such as intensity, content or generalization of delusions.

=== 19th century ===
Pinel's successor, Esquirol, extended Pinel's categories to five. Both made a clear distinction between insanity (including mania and dementia) as opposed to mental retardation (including idiocy and imbecility). Esquirol developed a concept of monomania—a periodic delusional fixation or undesirable disposition on one theme—that became a broad and common diagnosis and a part of popular culture for much of the 19th century. The diagnosis of "moral insanity" coined by James Prichard also became popular; those with the condition did not seem delusional or intellectually impaired but seemed to have disordered emotions or behavior.

The botanical taxonomic approach was abandoned in the 19th century, in favor of an anatomical-clinical approach that became increasingly descriptive. There was a focus on identifying the particular psychological faculty involved in particular forms of insanity, including through phrenology, although some argued for a more central "unitary" cause. French and German psychiatric nosology was in the ascendency. The term "psychiatry" ("Psychiatrie") was coined by German physician Johann Christian Reil in 1808, from the Greek "ψυχή" (psychē: "soul or mind") and "ιατρός" (iatros: "healer or doctor"). The term "alienation" took on a psychiatric meaning in France, later adopted into medical English. The terms psychosis and neurosis came into use, the former viewed psychologically and the latter neurologically.

In the second half of the century, Karl Kahlbaum and Ewald Hecker developed a descriptive categorizion of syndromes, employing terms such as dysthymia, cyclothymia, catatonia, paranoia and hebephrenia. Wilhelm Griesinger (1817–1869) advanced a unitary scheme based on a concept of brain pathology. French psychiatrists Jules Baillarger described "folie à double forme" and Jean-Pierre Falret described "la folie circulaire"—alternating mania and depression.

The concept of adolescent insanity or developmental insanity was advanced by Scottish Asylum Superintendent and Lecturer in Mental Diseases Thomas Clouston in 1873, describing a psychotic condition which generally impacts those aged 18–24 years, particularly males, and in 30% of cases proceeded to "a secondary dementia".

The concept of hysteria (wandering womb) had long been used, perhaps since ancient Egyptian times, and was later adopted by Freud. Descriptions of a specific syndrome now known as somatization disorder were first developed by the French physician, Paul Briquet in 1859.

An American physician, Beard, described "neurasthenia" in 1869. German neurologist Westphal, coined the term "obsessional neurosis" now termed obsessive-compulsive disorder, and agoraphobia. Alienists created a whole new series of diagnoses that highlighted single, impulsive behavior, such as kleptomania, dipsomania, pyromania, and nymphomania. The diagnosis of drapetomania was also developed in the Southern United States to explain the perceived irrationality of black slaves trying to escape what was thought to be a suitable role.

The scientific study of homosexuality began in the 19th century, informally viewed either as natural or as a disorder. Kraepelin included it as a disorder in his Compendium der Psychiatrie that he published in successive editions from 1883.

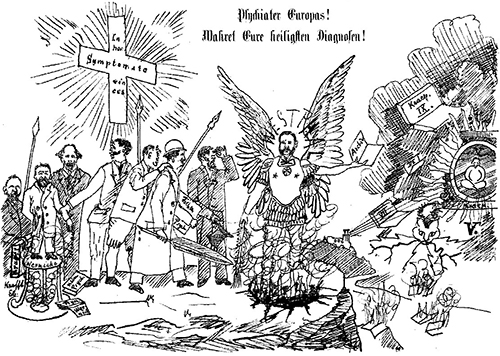
"Psychiatrists of Europe! Protect your sanctified diagnoses!" Cartoon by Emil Kraepelin, 1896.

In the late 19th century, Koch referred to "psychopathic inferiority" as a new term for moral insanity. In the 20th century the term became known as "psychopathy" or "sociopathy", related specifically to antisocial behavior. Related studies led to the DSM-III category of antisocial personality disorder.

=== 20th century ===
Influenced by the approach of Kahlbaum and others, and developing his concepts in publications spanning the turn of the century, German psychiatrist Emil Kraepelin advanced a new system. He grouped together a number of existing diagnoses that appeared to all have a deteriorating course over time—such as catatonia, hebephrenia and dementia paranoides—under another existing term "dementia praecox" (meaning "early senility", later renamed schizophrenia). Another set of diagnoses that appeared to have a periodic course and better outcome were grouped together under the category of manic-depressive insanity (mood disorder). He also proposed a third category of psychosis, called paranoia, involving delusions but not the more general deficits and poor course attributed to dementia praecox. In all he proposed 15 categories, also including psychogenic neurosis, psychopathic personality, and syndromes of defective mental development (mental retardation). He eventually included homosexuality in the category of "mental conditions of constitutional origin".

The neuroses were later split into anxiety disorders and other disorders.

Freud wrote extensively on hysteria and also coined the term, "anxiety neurosis", which appeared in DSM-I and DSM-II. Checklist criteria for this led to studies that were to define panic disorder for DSM-III.

Early 20th century schemes in Europe and the United States reflected a brain disease (or degeneration) model that had emerged during the 19th century, as well as some ideas from Darwin's theory of evolution and/or Freud's psychoanalytic theories.

Psychoanalytic theory did not rest on classification of distinct disorders, but pursued analyses of unconscious conflicts and their manifestations within an individual's life. It dealt with neurosis, psychosis, and perversion. The concept of borderline personality disorder and other personality disorder diagnoses were later formalized from such psychoanalytic theories, though such ego psychology-based lines of development diverged substantially from the paths taken elsewhere within psychoanalysis.

The philosopher and psychiatrist Karl Jaspers made influential use of a "biographical method" and suggested ways to diagnose based on the form rather than content of beliefs or perceptions. In regard to classification in general he prophetically remarked that: "When we design a diagnostic schema, we can only do so if we forego something at the outset … and in the face of facts we have to draw the line where none exists... A classification therefore has only provisional value. It is a fiction which will discharge its function if it proves to be the most apt for the time".

Adolph Meyer advanced a mixed biosocial scheme that emphasized the reactions and adaptations of the whole organism to life experiences.

In 1945, William C. Menninger advanced a classification scheme for the US army, called Medical 203, synthesizing ideas of the time into five major groups. This system was adopted by the Veterans Administration in the United States and strongly influenced the DSM.

The term stress, having emerged from endocrinology work in the 1930s, was popularized with an increasingly broad biopsychosocial meaning, and was increasingly linked to mental disorders. The diagnosis of post-traumatic stress disorder was later created.

Mental disorders were first included in the sixth revision of the International Classification of Diseases (ICD-6) in 1949. Three years later, in 1952, the American Psychiatric Association created its own classification system, DSM-I.

The Feighner Criteria group described fourteen major psychiatric disorders for which careful research studies were available, including homosexuality. These developed as the Research Diagnostic Criteria, adopted and further developed by the DSM-III.

The DSM and ICD developed, partly in sync, in the context of mainstream psychiatric research and theory. Debates continued and developed about the definition of mental illness, the medical model, categorical vs dimensional approaches, and whether and how to include suffering and impairment criteria. There is some attempt to construct novel schemes, for example from an attachment perspective where patterns of symptoms are construed as evidence of specific patterns of disrupted attachment, coupled with specific types of subsequent trauma.

=== 21st century ===
The ICD-11 and DSM-5 are being developed at the start of the 21st century. Any radical new developments in classification are said to be more likely to be introduced by the APA than by the WHO, mainly because the former only has to persuade its own board of trustees whereas the latter has to persuade the representatives of over 200 countries at a formal revision conference. In addition, while the DSM is a bestselling publication that makes huge profits for APA, the WHO incurs major expense in determining international consensus for revisions to the ICD. Although there is an ongoing attempt to reduce trivial or accidental differences between the DSM and ICD, it is thought that the APA and the WHO are likely to continue to produce new versions of their manuals and, in some respects, to compete with one another.

== Criticism ==
There is ongoing scientific doubt concerning the construct validity and reliability of psychiatric diagnostic categories and criteria, even though they have been increasingly standardized to improve inter-rater agreement in controlled research. In the United States, there have been calls and endorsements for a congressional hearing to explore the nature and extent of harm potentially caused by this "minimally investigated enterprise".

Other specific criticisms of the current schemes include: attempts to demonstrate natural boundaries between related syndromes, or between a common syndrome and normality, have failed; inappropriateness of statistical (e.g., factor-analytic) arguments and lack of functionality considerations in the analysis of a structure of behavioral pathology; the disorders of current classification are probably surface phenomena that can have many different interacting causes, yet "the mere fact that a diagnostic concept is listed in an official nomenclature and provided with a precise operational definition tends to encourage us to assume that it is a "quasi-disease entity" that can be invoked to explain the patient's symptoms"; and that the diagnostic manuals have led to an unintended decline in careful evaluation of each individual person's experiences and social context.

Psychodynamic schemes have traditionally given the latter phenomenological aspect greater consideration, but, in psychoanalytic terms, have been long criticized on numerous grounds.

Some have argued that reliance on operational definition requires that intuitive concepts, such as depression, be operationally defined before they become amenable to scientific investigation. However, John Stuart Mill pointed out the dangers of believing that anything that could be given a name must refer to a thing and Stephen Jay Gould and others have criticized psychologists for doing just that. One critic states that "instead of replacing 'metaphysical' terms such as 'desire' and 'purpose', they used [them] to legitimize them by giving them operational definitions. Thus in psychology, as in economics, the initial, quite radical operationalist ideas eventually came to serve as little more than a 'reassurance fetish' (Koch 1992, 275) for mainstream methodological practice." According to Tadafumi Kato, since the era of Emil Kraepelin, psychiatrists have been trying to differentiate mental disorders by using clinical interviews. Kato argues there has been little progress over the last century and that only modest improvements are possible in this way; he suggests that only neurobiological studies using modern technology could form the basis for a new classification.

According to Heinz Katsching, expert committees have combined phenomenological criteria in variable ways into categories of mental disorders, repeatedly defined and redefined over the last half century. The diagnostic categories are termed "disorders," yet, unlike most medical diseases, which are validated by biological criteria, they are framed as medical diseases identified by medical diagnoses. He describes them as top-down classification systems similar to the botanic classifications of plants in the 17th and 18th centuries, when experts decided a priori which visible aspects of plants were relevant. Katsching notes that while psychopathological phenomena are certainly observed and experienced, the conceptual basis of psychiatric diagnostic categories is questioned from various ideological perspectives.

Psychiatrist Joel Paris argues that psychiatry is sometimes susceptible to diagnostic fads. Some have been based on theory (e.g., overdiagnosis of schizophrenia), some based on etiological concepts (e.g., overdiagnosis of post-traumatic stress disorder), and some based on the development of treatments. Paris points out that psychiatrists like to diagnose conditions they can treat, and gives examples of what he sees as prescribing patterns paralleling diagnostic trends, for example an increase in bipolar diagnosis once lithium came into use, and similar scenarios with the use of electroconvulsive therapy, neuroleptics, tricyclic antidepressants, and SSRIs. He notes that there was a time when every patient seemed to have "latent schizophrenia" and another time when everything in psychiatry seemed to be "masked depression", and he fears that the boundaries of the bipolar spectrum concept, including in application to children, are similarly expanding. Allen Frances has suggested fad diagnostic trends regarding autism and attention deficit hyperactivity disorder.

Since the 1980s, psychologist Paula Caplan has had concerns about psychiatric diagnosis, and people being arbitrarily "slapped with a psychiatric label". Caplan says psychiatric diagnosis is unregulated, so doctors are not required to spend much time understanding patients' situations or to seek another doctor's opinion. The criteria for allocating psychiatric labels are contained in the Diagnostic and Statistical Manual of Mental Disorders, which can "lead a therapist to focus on narrow checklists of symptoms, with little consideration for what is causing the patient's suffering". So, according to Caplan, getting a psychiatric diagnosis and label often hinders recovery.

The DSM and ICD approach remains under attack, both because of the implied causality model and because some researchers believe it is better to focus on underlying brain differences, which can precede symptoms by many years.

== See also ==
- Abnormal psychology
- Diagnosis
- Diagnostic classification and rating scales used in psychiatry
- Medical classification
  - DSM-IV codes
  - Structured Clinical Interview for DSM-IV (SCID)
- Nosology
- Operationalism
- Psychopathology
- Relational disorder (proposed DSM-5 new diagnosis)
