= Paraphrenia =

- Other names: Paraphrenic syndrome
- Specialty: Psychiatry
- Symptoms: Hallucinations, delusions, paranoia
- Usual onset: 60 years old
- Duration: Chronic
- Differential diagnosis: Schizophrenia, bipolar disorder, delusional disorder
- Medication: Antipsychotics
- Prognosis: Normal life expectancy

Paraphrenia is a mental disorder characterized by an organized system of paranoid delusions with or without hallucinations (the positive symptoms of schizophrenia) and without deterioration of intellect or personality (its negative symptoms).

This disorder is also distinguished from schizophrenia by a lower hereditary occurrence, less premorbid maladjustment, and a slower rate of progression. Onset of symptoms generally occurs later in life, near the age of 60. The prevalence of the disorder among the elderly is between 0.1% and 4%.

Paraphrenia is not included in the DSM-5; psychiatrists often diagnose patients presenting with paraphrenia as having atypical psychosis, delusional disorder, psychosis not otherwise specified, schizoaffective disorders, and persistent persecutory states of older adults. Recently, mental health professionals have also been classifying paraphrenia as very late-onset schizophrenia-like psychosis.

In the Russian psychiatric manuals, paraphrenia is the last stage of development of paranoid schizophrenia. "Systematized paraphrenia" (with systematized delusions, or delusions with complex logical structure) and "expansive-paranoid paraphrenia" (with expansive/grandiose delusions and persecutory delusions) are the variants of paranoid schizophrenia (F20.0). Sometimes systematized paraphrenia can be seen with delusional disorder (F22.0). The word is from Ancient Greek παρά (pará; 'beside, near') and φρήν (phrḗn; 'intellect, mind').

== Signs and symptoms ==
The main symptoms of paraphrenia are paranoid delusions and hallucinations. The delusions often involve the individual being the subject of persecution, although they can also be erotic, hypochondriacal, or grandiose in nature. The majority of hallucinations associated with paraphrenia are auditory, with 75% of patients reporting such an experience; however, visual, tactile, and olfactory hallucinations have also been reported. The paranoia and hallucinations can combine in the form of "threatening or accusatory voices coming from neighbouring houses [and] are frequently reported by the patients as disturbing and undeserved". Patients also present with a lack of symptoms commonly found in other mental disorders similar to paraphrenia. There is no significant deterioration of intellect, personality, or habits and patients often remain clean and mostly self-sufficient. Patients also remain oriented well in time and space.

Paraphrenia is different from schizophrenia because, while both disorders result in delusions and hallucinations, individuals with schizophrenia exhibit changes and deterioration of personality whereas individuals with paraphrenia maintain a well-preserved personality and affective response.

== Causes ==
=== Neurological ===
Paraphrenia is often associated with a physical change in the brain, such as a tumor, stroke, ventricular enlargement, or neurodegenerative process. Research that reviewed the relationship between organic brain lesions and the development of delusions suggested that "brain lesions which lead to subcortical dysfunction could produce delusions when elaborated by an intact cortex".

=== Predisposing factors ===
Many patients who present with paraphrenia have significant auditory or visual loss, are socially isolated, do not have a permanent home, are unmarried and without children, and have maladaptive personality traits. While these factors do not cause paraphrenia, they do make individuals more likely to develop the disorder later in life.

== Diagnosis ==
While the diagnosis of paraphrenia is absent from recent revisions of the DSM and the ICD, many studies have recognized the condition as "a viable diagnostic entity that is distinct from schizophrenia, with organic factors playing a role in a significant portion of patients." As such, paraphrenia is seen as being distinct from both schizophrenia and progressive dementia in old age. Ravindran (1999) developed a list of criteria for the diagnosis of paraphrenia, which agrees with much of the research done up to the time it was published.

1. A delusional disorder of at least six months duration characterized by the following:

a. Preoccupation with one or more semisystematized delusions, often accompanied by auditory hallucinations.
b. Affect notably well-preserved and appropriate. Ability to maintain rapport with others.
c. None of

i. Intellectual deterioration
ii. Visual hallucinations
iii. Incoherence
iv. Flat or grossly inappropriate affect
v. Grossly disorganized behavior at times other than during the acute episode.

d. Disturbance of behavior understandable in relation to the content of the delusions and hallucinations.
e. Only partly meets criterion A for schizophrenia. No significant organic brain disorder.

== Management ==
Research suggests that paraphrenics respond well to antipsychotic drug therapy if doctors can successfully achieve sufficient compliance. Herbert found that Stelazine combined with Disipal was an effective treatment. It promoted the discharging of patients and kept discharged patients from being readmitted later. While behavior therapy may help patients reduce their preoccupation with delusions, psychotherapy is not currently of primary value.

== Prognosis ==
Individuals who develop paraphrenia have a life expectancy similar to the normal population. Recovery from the psychotic symptoms seems to be rare, and in most cases paraphrenia results in in-patient status for the remainder of the life of the patient. Patients experience a slow deterioration of cognitive functions and the disorder can lead to dementia in some cases, but this development is no greater than the normal population.

== Epidemiology ==
Studies suggest that the prevalence of paraphrenia in the elderly population is around 2–4%.

=== Sex differences ===
While paraphrenia can occur in both men and women, it is more common in women, even after the difference has been adjusted for life expectancies. The ratio of women with paraphrenia to men with paraphrenia is anywhere from 3:1 to 45:2.

=== Age ===
It is seen mainly in patients over the age of 60, but has been known to occur in patients in their 40s and 50s.

=== Personality type and living situation ===
It is suggested that individuals who develop paraphrenia later in life have premorbid personalities, and can be described as "quarrelsome, religious, suspicious or sensitive, unsociable and cold-hearted." Many patients were also described as being solitary, eccentric, isolated and difficult individuals; these characteristics were also long-standing rather than introduced by the disorder. Most of the traits recognized prior to the onset of paraphrenia in individuals can be grouped as either paranoid or schizoid. Patients presenting with paraphrenia were most often found to be living by themselves (either single, widowed, or divorced). There have also been reports of low marriage rate among paraphrenics and these individuals also have few or no children (possibly because of this premorbid personality).

=== Physical factors ===
The development of paranoia and hallucinations in old age have been related to both auditory and visual impairment, and individuals with paraphrenia often present with one or both of these impairments. Hearing loss in paraphrenics is associated with early age of onset, long duration, and profound auditory loss.

== History ==
The term paraphrenia was originally popularized by Karl Ludwig Kahlbaum in 1863 to describe the tendency of certain psychiatric disorders to occur during certain transitional periods in life (describing paraphrenia hebetica as the insanity of the adolescence and paraphrenia senilis as the insanity of the elders.

The term was also used by Sigmund Freud for a short time starting in 1911 as an alternative to the terms schizophrenia and dementia praecox, which in his estimation did not correctly identify the underlying condition, and by Emil Kraepelin in 1912/3, who changed its meaning to describe paraphrenia as it is understood today, as a small group of individuals that have many of the symptoms of schizophrenia with a lack of deterioration and thought disorder. Kraepelin's study was discredited by Wilhelm Mayer in 1921 when he conducted a follow-up study using Kraepelin's data. His study suggested that there was little to no discrimination between schizophrenia and paraphrenia; given enough time, patients presenting with paraphrenia will merge into the schizophrenic pool. However, Meyer's data are open to various interpretations. In 1952, Roth and Morrissey conducted a large study in which they surveyed the mental hospital admissions of older patients. They characterized patients as having "paraphrenic delusions which… occurred in each case in the setting of a well-preserved intellect and personality, were often ‘primary’ in character, and were usually associated with the passivity failings or other volitional disturbances and hallucinations in clear consciousness pathognomonic of schizophrenia".

In recent medicine, the term paraphrenia has been replaced by the diagnosis of "very late-onset schizophrenia-like psychosis" proposed by Robert Howard and other experts in late-onset psychosis and has also been called "atypical psychoses, delusional disorder, psychoses not otherwise specified, schizoaffective disorders, and persistent persecutory states of older adults" by psychotherapists. Current studies, however, recognize the condition as "a viable diagnostic entity that is distinct from schizophrenia, with organic factors playing a role in a significant portion of patients."
