= Unitary psychosis =

19-century belief prevalent in German psychiatry

Unitary psychosis (Einheitspsychose) refers to the 19th-century belief prevalent in German psychiatry until the era of Emil Kraepelin that all forms of psychosis were surface variations of a single underlying disease process. According to this model, there were no distinct disease entities in psychiatry but only varieties of a single universal madness and the boundaries between these variants were fluid. The prevalence of the concept in Germany during the mid-19th century can be understood in terms of a general resistance to Cartesian dualism and faculty psychology as expressed in Naturphilosophie and other Romantic doctrines that emphasised the unity of body, mind and spirit.

== 19th-century proponents ==
=== Joseph Guislain ===
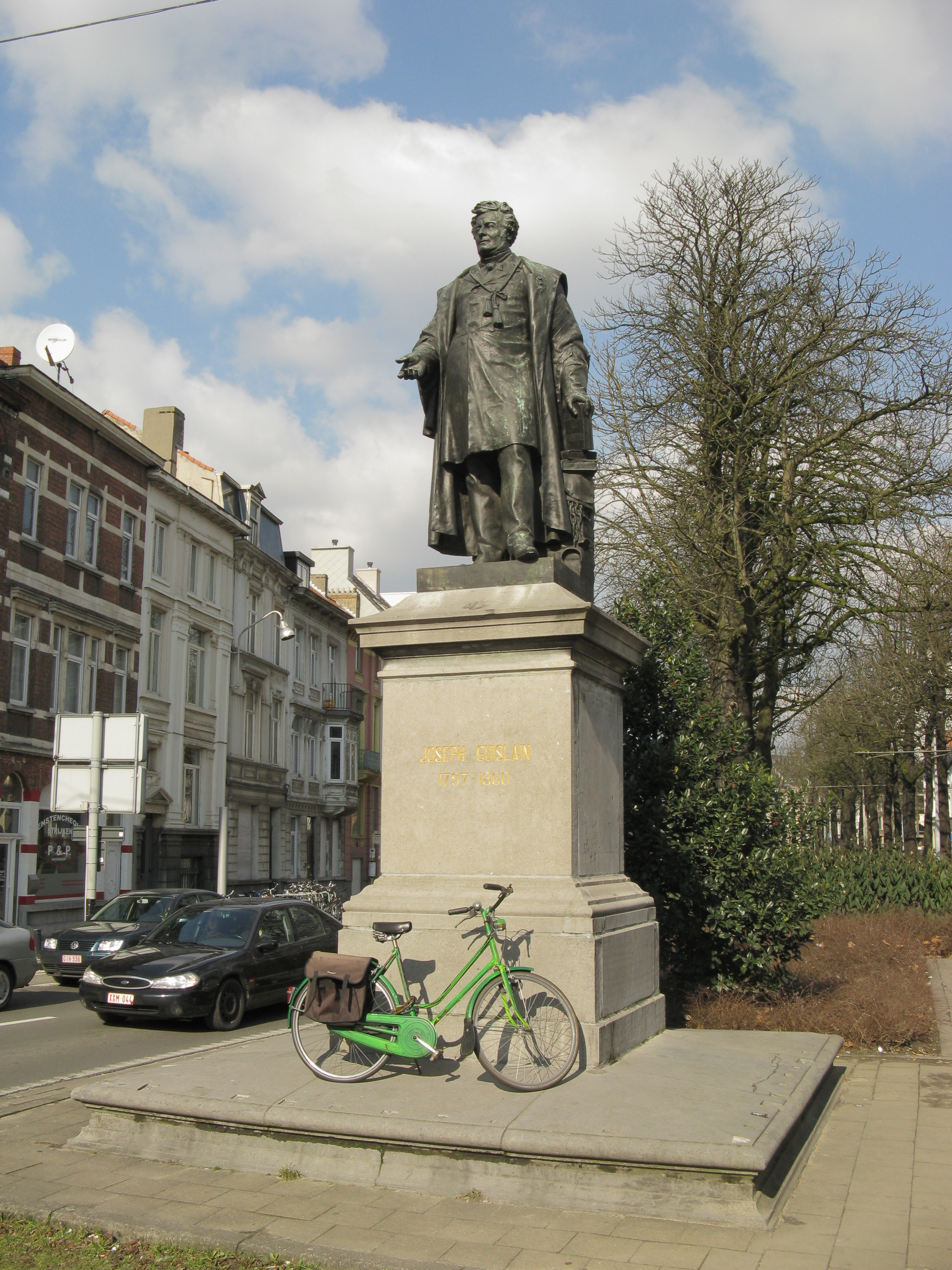
Statue of Joseph Guislain (1797–1860)

The concept of unitary psychosis is ultimately derived from the work of the Belgian psychiatrist Joseph Guislain (1797–1860). In 1833 he published Traité Des Phrénopathies ou Doctrine Nouvelle des Maladies Mentales in which he proposed a complex system of psychiatric classification encompassing almost a hundred different mental states. He conceptualised this mosaic of symptoms as arising from any of four consecutive stages in mental disease. These were: "(1) exaltation of the brain's activity, (2) aberration of the brain's structures, (3) oppression of the brain's structures, and (4) exhaustion of psychic energy." For Guislain, what he termed phrénalgie, or mental pain, formed the basis of all mental illness where the "psychic reaction" engendered by "worry, annoyance, pain" or other mental "irritants" brought "physical reactions along with it." Mental illness would then unfold along seven successive stages of progressive deterioration, which he detailed as: hyperphrénie (mania); paraphrénie (folie); hyperplexie (stupidity); hyperspasmie (epilepsy); ideosynchysie (hallucinations); analcouthie (confusion); and noasthénie (dementia).

=== Ernst Albrecht von Zeller ===
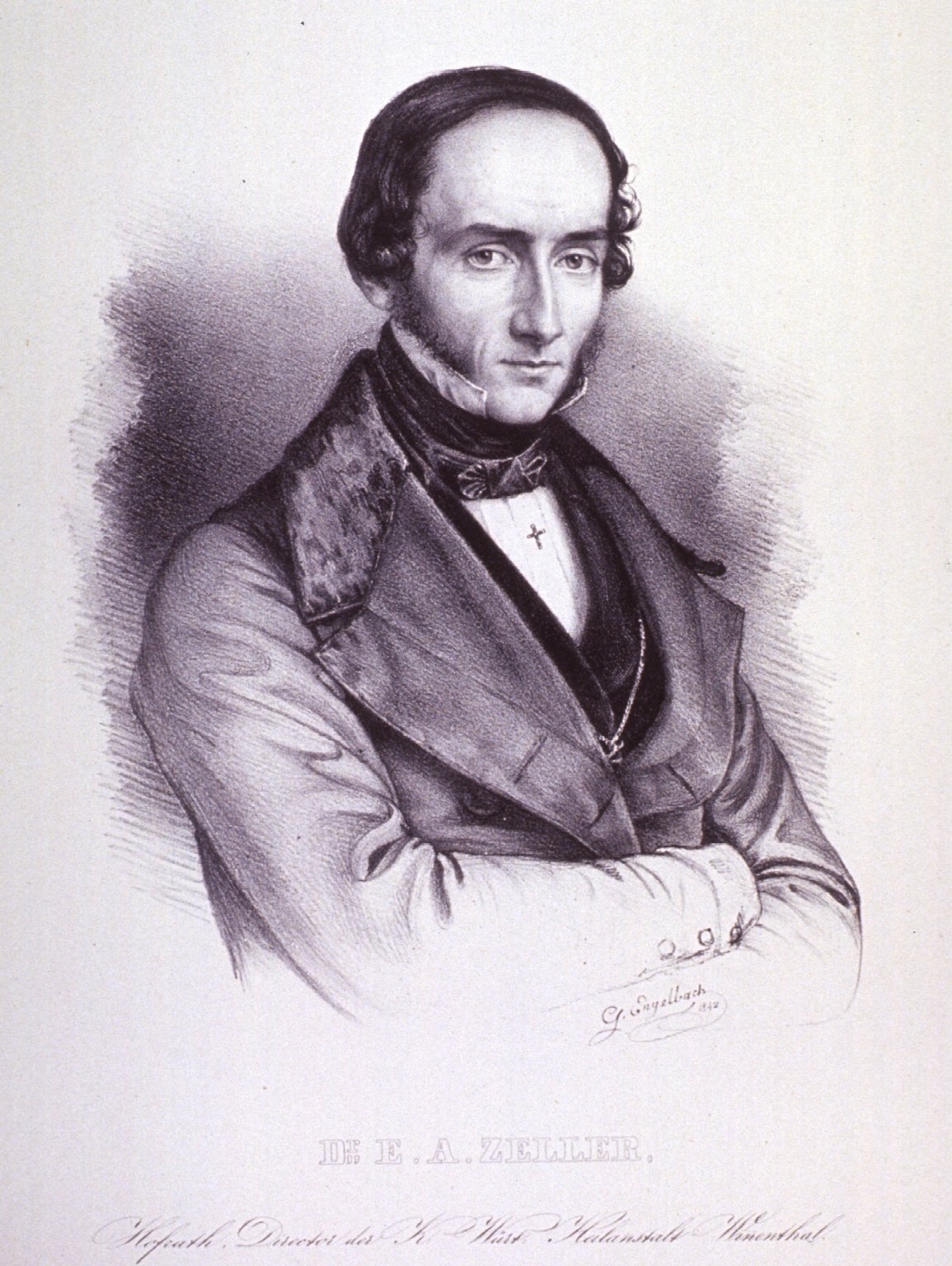
Ernst Albrecht von Zeller (1804–1877)

Guislain's thesis was taken up by the German psychiatrist Ernst Albrecht von Zeller (1804–1877), who translated his text into German in 1837. Zeller was the medical director of a private asylum at Winnenthal in Württemberg. He would become perhaps the figure most associated with the concept of unitary psychosis in German psychiatry. In 1834 he had already declared that the different varieties of mental illness were simply differing stages in a common morbid process and that "in the course of one case all the main forms of mental disorder may occur". His adoption of the concept of unitary madness was predicated on his belief in the unity of the human soul or character and that man was at once composed of both material and spiritual elements. Deriving this belief in part from Naturphilosophie and the influence of anthropology on German psychiatric concepts, he held that it was this fundamental spiritual self that was afflicted in madness. For Zeller, both organic and moral (or psychological) causes combined to produce mental illness. The organic causes of mental illness were, he argued, observable in the physical illnesses that preceded its onset. He reasoned, however, that "cases are rare in which the mental disorder is caused by purely organic problems of the central nervous system". Instead, he held that the psychological pain occasioned by remorse, guilt, poverty and social reversal was the universal causal factor in all forms of mental morbidity. Somatic and moral factors and the pain attendant on the latter combined variously to produce the four stages of a universal disease: melancholia (the fundamental form of mental disorder which led to the other stages), mania, paranoia and, finally, dementia.

=== Wilhelm Griesinger ===
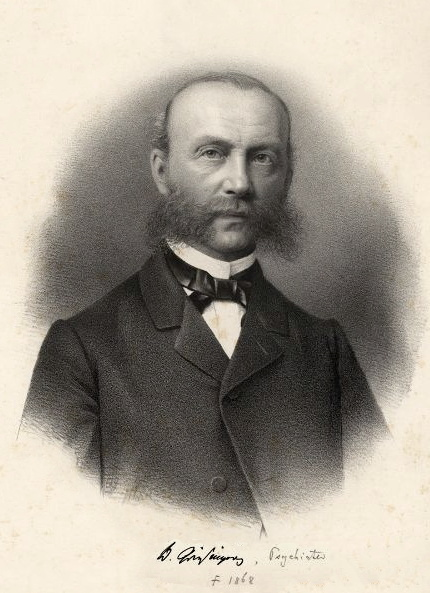
Wilhelm Griesinger (1817–1868)

For a period of two years from 1840 Wilhelm Griesinger (1817–1868) worked as a medical assistant to Zeller at the Winnental Asylum. While there, he adopted and adapted his senior colleague's model of a unitary psychosis. He did not, however, shares Zeller's conviction regarding the nature of the human soul or character and its role in madness. A convinced somaticist and commonly considered one of the founders of materialist psychiatry, in the 1845 text which established him as one of the leading scientific psychiatrists of his era, Pathologie und Therapie der psychischen Krankheiten, he conceived of character, or "psychological tonus", as derived from the action of a postulated "psychic reflex action" (psychische Reflexaktion) produced by the stimulus of the accumulated representations (Vorstellungen) of the individual's life experience. The concept of psychic reflex action was drawn by analogy from the physiological reflex action of the nervous system in response to a stimulus and he argued that both forms of reflex had the same mode of action and obeyed the same physical laws. Mental illnesses occurred, he posited, when the system of psychic reflex action failed to function correctly and were either diminished, leading to melancholia, or accelerated, leading to mania. His belief was that mental illness was a disease of the brain but that this in turn was caused by psychological factors. His emphasis on the brain as the central site of mental illness has led to his association with the so-called Somatiker (somaticists) who had argued that the causes of mental illness were entirely physical whereas their opponents, the Psychiker, insisted that mental disorders were the result of psychological perversions, moral failings, or diseases of the soul (Seelenkrankheit). As with Zeller, he postulated that melancholia constituted the primary form of mental illness which then passed to mania before terminating in dementia. In his 1861 text Mental Pathology and Therapeutics Griesinger proposed a classificatory division of types of mental anomalies between those characterised by emotional disturbances and those characterised by disturbances in the intellectual and volitional functions. He argued, based on his observation of cases, that the former condition preceded the latter where disorders of the intellect and will appeared "only as consequences and terminations" of disturbances of the emotions if "the cerebral affliction has not been cured". These two categories thus constituted, for Griesigner, "the different forms [and] the different stages of one morbid process". The general trajectory of this mental pathology tended towards "a constant progressive course, which may even proceed to complete destruction of the mental life". Greisinger maintained his belief in unitary psychosis until the 1860s.

=== Heinrich Neumann ===
The greatest defender and the most radical proponent of the concept of unitary psychosis in the 19th century was the German psychiatrist Heinrich Neumann (1814–1888). Switching from general medicine to psychiatry in the 1850s, he became the owner of a private psychiatric clinic and from 1874 to 1884 he attained the post of medical director at a university-based clinical ward in the Breslau city hospital (now Wrocław in Poland). He was succeeded by his former medical assistant, Carl Wernicke, a noted neuropsychiatrist. In his Lehrbuch der Psychiatrie (Textbook of Psychiatry) of 1859 he rejected any attempt at psychiatric classification as "artificial". He asserted that, "There is only one type of mental disorder. We call it madness (Irresein). Insanity does not possess different forms but different stages; they are called insanity (Wahnsinn), confusion (Verwirrheit), and dementia (Blödsinn)." Neumann exceeded the position of previous adherents of the unitarian concept by propounding not simply a continuum among diseases but also between disease and health. Thus, he argued that, "sleeplessness, illusions, exaggerated sensitivity ... cause illness, then madness, confusion, and dementia". The proposed mechanism underlying this process was what Neumann termed "metamorphosis" which referred to a disturbance in consciousness that led to errors in the interpretation of sensations. For Neumann an overabundance of stimulation produced mental irritation and mania. As this depleted mental energy it could then result in hallucinations. The medical historian Eric Engstrom has argued that Neumann's proposal to subsume the entire range of diverse psychiatric symptomatology into the concept of Einheitspsychose had the virtue of flexibility in its capacity to absorb any system of psychiatric classification. Engstom has also noted that the concept supported calls for the early committal to asylums of all potential patients as it did not link the likelihood of remission to disease classification but rather argued for early intervention to prevent the onset of chronic mental disability. Its wider support among asylum-based alienists (as medical practitioners in mental hospitals were then known) as opposed to academic psychiatrists was due to the fact that it was more applicable to the unhurried tempo of asylum routine where, unlike in university clinics, there was no perceived need for rapid diagnosis. Equally, medical formation in the asylum setting was focused on protracted clinical observation rather than the formal pedagogy of a standardised university curriculum.

== 19th-century critics ==
=== Karl Ludwig Kahlbaum ===
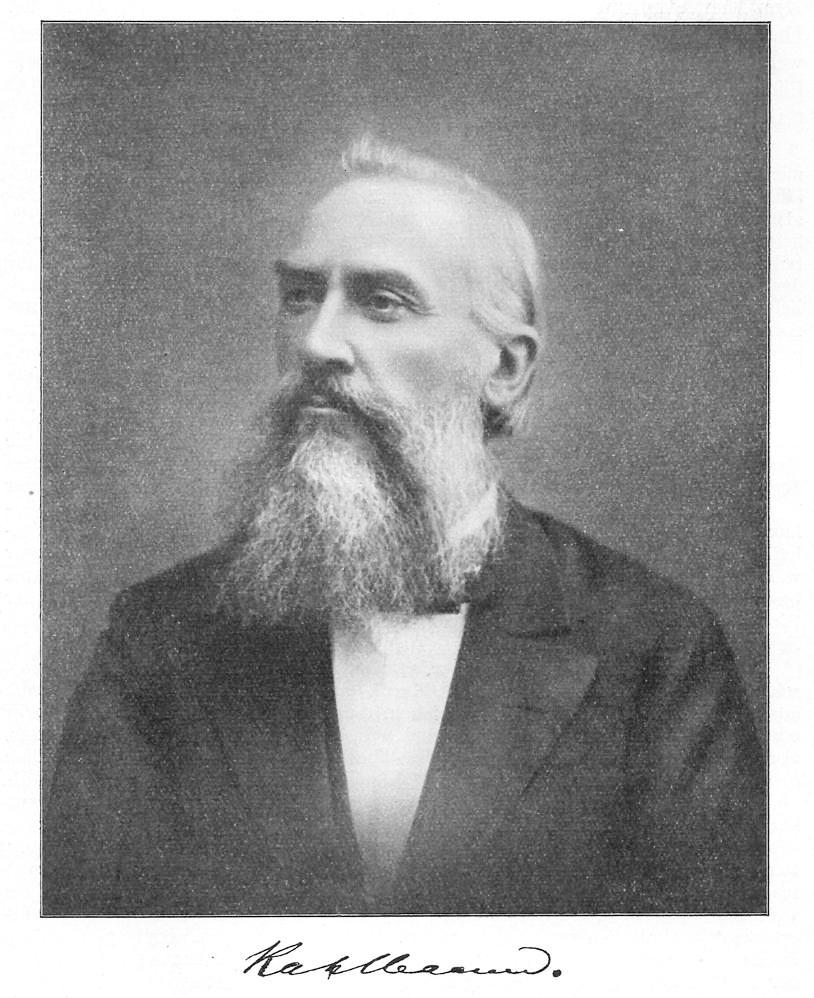
Karl Ludwig Kahlbaum (1828–1899)

From the 1860s the concept of unitary psychosis and its advocates came under increasing criticism. Karl Ludwig Kahlbaum (1829–1899), a German psychiatrist of seminal importance in the development of the modern nosology and a formative influence on the work of Emil Kraepelin, had taken issue with Neumann's assertion in his 1859 text that mental illness could not be categorised into discrete disease entities. Kahlbaum fashioned a response in 1863 with the publication of his Die Gruppierung der psychischen Krankheiten (The Classification of Psychiatric Diseases). This text delineated four distinct types of mental illness (vesania): vesania acuta, vesania typica, vesania progressiva and vesania catatonica. He asserted that the unitarian position signalled the "end to all diagnosis in the field of psychopathology." For Kahlbaum, Neumann's failure to engage in any attempt at disease classification, his rejection of diagnosis as abstraction and his focus only upon the individual manifestation of mental illness constituted an enterprise without any scientific validity. In the absence of meaningful and acute diagnostic categories in psychiatry Kahlbaum believed that both the development of effective therapeutic practices and the knowledge of mental illness would run stagnant.

=== Emil Kraepelin ===
During his inaugural lecture following his appointment to the chair of psychiatry in Dorpat University in 1887, Kraepelin contended that Zeller's notion of unitary psychosis had led to the calcification of clinical research in Germany until as late as the 1860s. The revival of a more objective clinical approach built upon observation, he contended, had had to await the contribution of researchers such as Ludwig Snell who wrote on monomania as a distinct disease entity in the 1870s. Kraepelin's approach to classification of mental illness was based on longitudinal studies of symptoms, course and outcome. He concluded from his studies that there were only two major forms of serious mental illness: dementia praecox and manic depression. This division of the psychoses, currently enshrined in modern classification systems as that between schizophrenia and bipolar disorder and referred to as the Kraepelinian dichotomy, has remained in place for more than a hundred years.

== 20th-century revivals ==
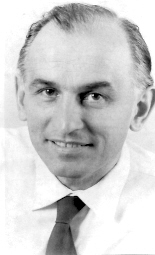
Klaus Conrad (1905–1961)

Variations of the unitary psychosis thesis have been revived occasionally during the 20th century. These have generally taken the form of statistical analyses that purport to demonstrate that the Kraepelinian dichotomy is unstable. In the modern era the concept of schizoaffective psychosis, which straddles the Kraepelinian divide, when delineated as a condition sharing a common causal pathway as both schizophrenia and affective psychosis, shares aspects of the more radical notion of unitary psychosis in regarding the individual psychoses as points on a continuum.

=== Klaus Conrad ===
Klaus Conrad (1905–1961), a German neuropsychiatrist and a member of the Nazi party from 1940, became convinced that there was only one endogenous psychosis based partly upon his observation that cyclothymic patients, or those suffering from affective psychosis, often sired schizophrenic children. He also held the belief, derived from his clinical experience, that symptoms associated with particular diagnostic categories were fluid and that a patient could, for instance, exhibit signs of mania or depression which might then reappear periodically and subsequently develop delusions and undergo a deterioration in personality. Likewise, symptoms thought to be characteristic of schizophrenia, such as delusions, hallucinations and catatonia, were, he alleged, also found in depression and mania. Conrad also contested the then established classificatory division between the endogenous and exogenous psychoses or, respectively, psychoses of internal or external origin, as whether the disease causing agent was "physical exhaustion or heightened emotion" it "attacked the same structure, physiological mechanism, biological metabolism". Conrad, a proponent of Gestalt psychology, is typically characterised as having expounded a view of psychosis that is commensurate with the mid-19th century psychiatric concept of unitary psychosis.

== Bibliography ==
- Angst, Jules (2002). "Historical aspects of the dichotomy between manic–depressive disorders and schizophrenia". Schizophrenia Research. 57 (1): 5–13. doi:10.1016/S0920-9964(02)00328-6. PMID 12165371. S2CID 33585559.
- Beer, M.D. (1996). "Psychosis: A history of the concept". Comprehensive Psychiatry. 37 (4): 273–91. doi:10.1016/S0010-440X(96)90007-3. PMID 8826692.
- Berrios, German E.; Beer, M.D. (1994). "The notion of unitary psychosis: a conceptual history" (PDF). History of Psychiatry. 5 (17): 13–36. doi:10.1177/0957154X9400501702. ISSN 0957-154X. PMID 11639278. S2CID 21417530.
- Berrios, German E.; Beer, M.D. (1995). "Unitary psychosis concept: clinical section". In German E. Berrios and Roy Porter (ed.). A History of Clinical Psychiatry: The Origin and History of Psychiatric Disorders. London: Athlone. pp. 313–35. ISBN 978-0-485-24011-5.
- Bruijnzeel, Dawn; Tandon, Rajiv (2011). "The Concept of Schizophrenia: From the 1850s to the DSM-5". Psychiatric Annals. 41 (5): 289–95. doi:10.3928/00485713-20110425-08.
- Bürgy, Martin (2008). "The Concept of Psychosis: Historical and Phenomenological Aspects". Schizophrenia Bulletin. 34 (6): 1200–10. doi:10.1093/schbul/sbm136. PMC 2632489. PMID 18174608.
- Engstrom, Eric J. (2003). Clinical Psychiatry in Imperial Germany: a History of Psychiatric Practice. New York: Cornell University Press. ISBN 978-0-8014-4195-0.
- Engstrom, Eric J. (2016). "Emil Kraepelin's Inaugural Lecture in Dorpat: Contexts and Legacies". Trames. 20 (4): 337–350. doi:10.3176/tr.2016.4.02.
- Engstrom, Eric J. (2024). "On the Origins of Unitary Psychosis: Albert Zeller's Reception and Critique of Joseph Guislain's Traité sur les phrénopathies (1833/1838)". Psychiatrie – Sciences Humaines – Neurosciences. 22 (1): 43–62.
- Engstrom, Eric J.; Weber, Matthias M. (2005). "The Directions of Psychiatric Research: Introduction". History of Psychiatry. 16: 345–364. doi:10.1177/0957154X05056763. hdl:2262/51561.
- Guislain, Joseph (1835). Traité sur les phrénopathies, ou doctrine nouvelle des maladies mentales (2 ed.). Brussels: Etablissement encyclographique.
- Hoff, Paul (2009). "Historical roots of the concept of mental illness" (PDF). In I.M. Salloum and J.E. Mezzich (ed.). Psychiatric Diagnosis: Challenges and Prospects. Chichester: John Wiley and Sons. pp. 1–14. doi:10.1002/9780470743485.ch1. ISBN 9780470743485.
- Jaspers, Karl (1997) [1963]. General Psychopathology [Allgemeine Psychopathologie]. Vol. 2. Trans. J. Hoenig & Marian W. Hamilton. Baltimore: Johns Hopkins University Press. ISBN 978-0-8018-5775-1.
- Kahlbaum, Karl Ludwig (1863). Die Gruppierung der psychischen Krankheiten und die Eintheilung der Seelenstörungen: Entwurf einer historisch-kritischen Darstellung der bisherigen Eintheilungen und Versuch zur Anbahnung einer empirisch-wissenschaftlichen Grundlage der Psychiatrie als klinischer Disciplin. Danzig: Kafemann.
- Klee, Ernst (2005). Das Personenlexikon zum Dritten Reich. Wer war was vor und nach 1945 (2nd ed.). Frankfurt am Main: S. Fischer. ISBN 978-3-596-16048-8.
- Kraam, Abdullah (2004). "On the Origin of the Clinical Standpoint in Psychiatry. By Dr Ewald Hecker in Görlitz". History of Psychiatry. 15 (3): 345–60. doi:10.1177/0957154X04044598. PMID 15386867. S2CID 34933823.
- Kraam, Abdullah (2009). "Classic Text No. 77 'Hebephrenia. A contribution to clinical psychiatry' by Dr. Ewald Hecker in Görlitz (1871)". History of Psychiatry. 20 (1): 87–106. doi:10.1177/0957154X08099416. PMID 20617643. S2CID 43185310.
- Lanczik, M. (1992). "Karl Kahlbaum (1828–1899) and the Emergence of Psychopathological and Nosological Research in German psychiatry". History of Psychiatry. 3 (9): 53–8. doi:10.1177/0957154x9200300905. PMID 11612668. S2CID 22921829.
- Lanczik, Mario Horst; Beckmann, Helmut; Keil, Gundolf (1995). "Wernicke: clinical section". In German E. Berrios and Roy Porter (ed.). A History of Clinical Psychiatry: The Origin and History of Psychiatric Disorders. London: Athlone. pp. 302–12. ISBN 978-0-485-24011-5.
- Möller, Hans-Jürgen (2008). "Systematic of psychiatric approaches between categorical and dimensional approaches: Kraepelin's dichotomy and beyond". European Archives of Psychiatry and Clinical Neuroscience. 258 (Suppl. 2): 48–73. doi:10.1007/s00406-008-2004-3. PMID 18516518. S2CID 35482134.
- Noll, Richard (2007). The Encyclopedia of Schizophrenia and Other Psychotic Disorders (3rd ed.). New York: Infobase Publishing. ISBN 978-0-8160-6405-2.
- Pillmann, F.; Marneros, A. (2003). "Brief and acute psychoses: the development of concepts". History of Psychiatry. 14 (2): 161–77. doi:10.1177/0957154X030142002. PMID 14518487. S2CID 36206200.
- Shorter, Edward (1997). A History of Psychiatry. New York: John Wiley & Sons. ISBN 978-0-471-15749-6.
- Zeller, Albert; Engstrom, Eric J.; Berrios, German E. (2025). A History of Unitary Psychosis: A Contribution to the Historical Epistemology of Nineteenth Century Psychiatry. New York: Springer. ISBN 978-3-031-90182-9.
