= Dysphrenia =

Term for mental disorder in adults

The term dysphrenia was coined by the German medical specialist Karl Kahlbaum to designate a clinical picture in 19th-century psychiatry. Today the concept is still used in the western world as a lay generic synonym for mental disorder in adults, and as a term to describe different cognitive/verbal/behavioral deficits in children and adolescents. It is also used in the People's Republic of China, controversially, to identify a local medical diagnostic category. A number of followers of Falun Gong and other social movements considered insurrectionary by the regime are said to have been diagnosed with dysphrenia.
