= Emil Kraepelin =

German psychiatrist (1856–1926)

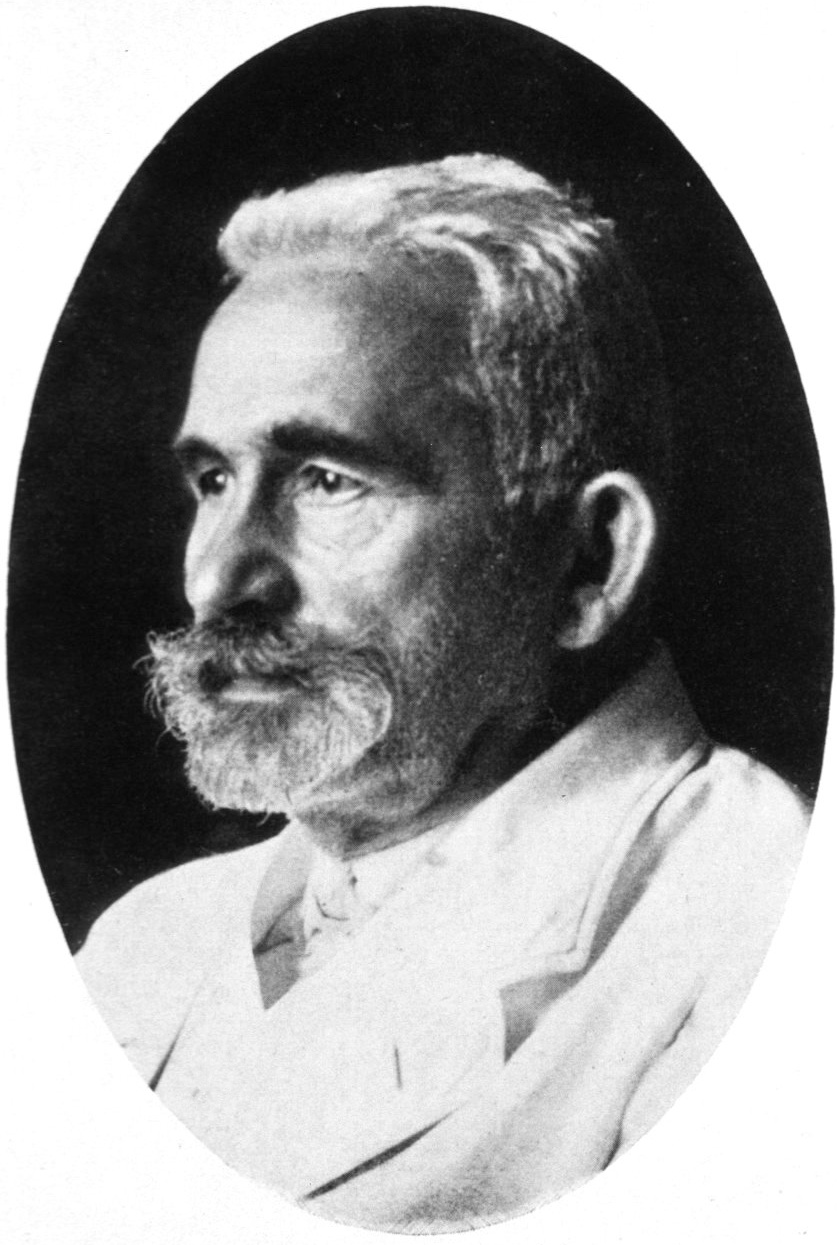
- Kraepelin in his later years
- Born: 15 February 1856; Neustrelitz, Grand Duchy of Mecklenburg-Strelitz, German Confederation
- Died: 7 October 1926 (aged 70); Munich, Bavaria, Weimar Republic
- Education: Leipzig University; University of Würzburg (MBBS, 1878); Ludwig-Maximilians-Universität München (Dr. hab. med., 1882)
- Known for: Classification of mental disorders, Kraepelinian dichotomy
- Spouse: Ina Marie Marie Wilhelmine Schwabe
- Children: 2 sons, 6 daughters
- Scientific career
- Fields: Psychiatry
- Workplaces: Leipzig University; Imperial University of Dorpat; Heidelberg University; Ludwig-Maximilians-Universität München
- Thesis: The Place of Psychology in Psychiatry (1882)

Emil Wilhelm Georg Magnus Kraepelin (/ˈkrɛpəlɪn/; German: [ˈeːmiːl 'kʁɛːpəliːn]; 15 February 1856 – 7 October 1926) was a German psychiatrist. Fellow psychiatrist Hans Eysenck's Encyclopedia of Psychology identified him as partially responsible for laying the foundations of modern scientific psychiatry, psychopharmacology, and psychiatric genetics.

Kraepelin believed the chief origin of psychiatric disease to be a combination of biological process and genetic disorder or malfunction. Kraepelin's theories dominated psychiatry at the start of the 20th century and, despite the later psychodynamic influence of Sigmund Freud and his disciples, enjoyed a revival at the 20th century's end. While he proclaimed his own high clinical standards of gathering information "by means of expert analysis of individual cases", he also drew on reported observations of officials not trained in psychiatry.

Kraepelin's textbooks do not contain detailed medical case histories of individuals, instead offering mosaic-like compilations of typical statements and behaviors from patients with a specific diagnosis. Kraepelin has been described as a "scientific manager" and "political operator" who developed "a large-scale, clinically oriented, epidemiological research programme".

Some of Kraepelin's theories were considered racist or discriminatory by some.

== Family and early life ==
Kraepelin, whose father, Karl Wilhelm, was a former opera singer, music teacher, and later successful story teller, was born in 1856 in Neustrelitz, in the Duchy of Mecklenburg-Strelitz in Germany. He was first introduced to biology by his brother Karl, 10 years older and, later, the director of the Naturhistorisches Museum Hamburg.

== Education and career ==
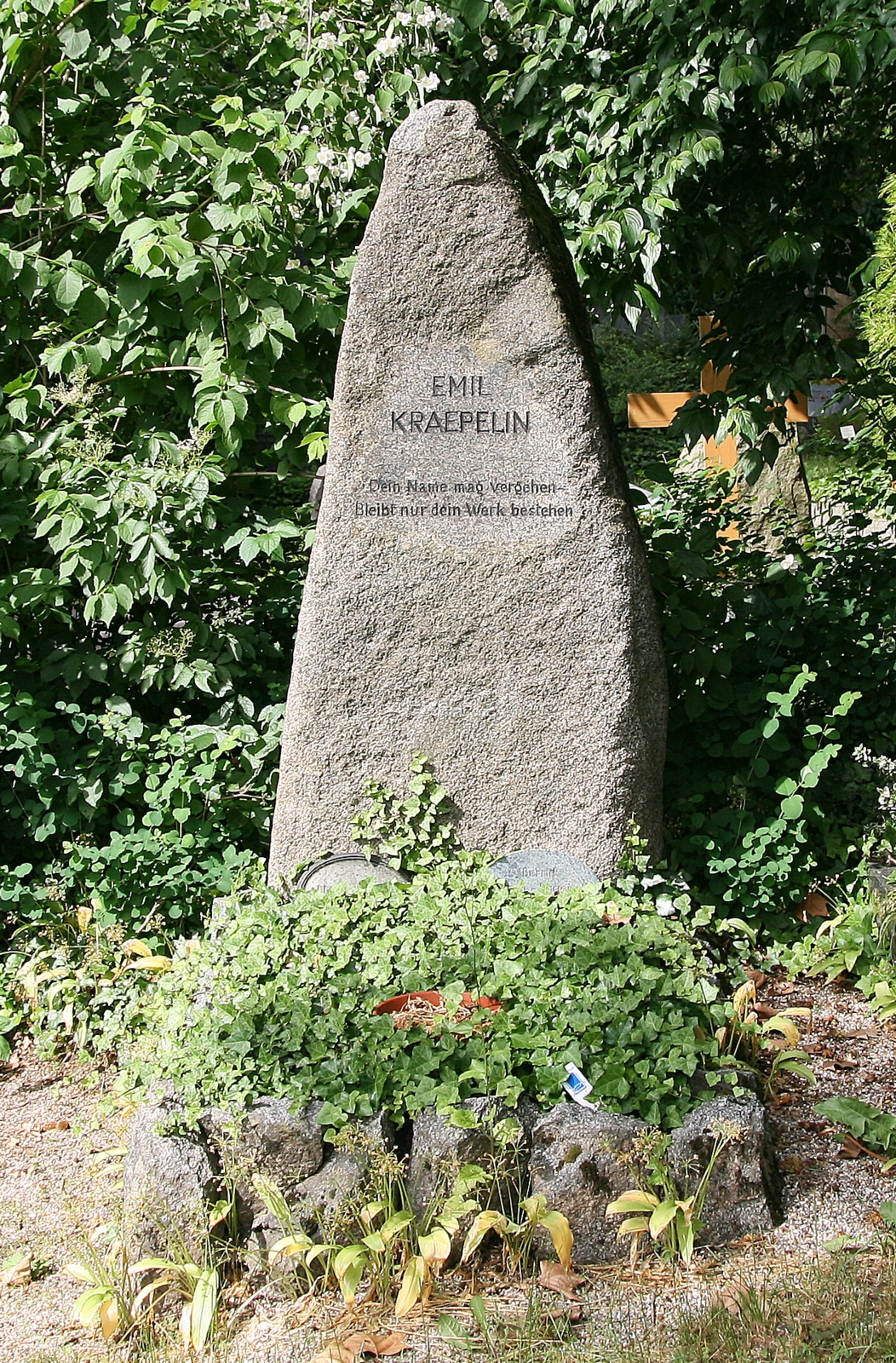
Grave in Heidelberg (2008)

Kraepelin began his medical studies in 1874 at the University of Leipzig and completed them at the University of Würzburg (1877–1878). At Leipzig, he studied neuropathology under Paul Flechsig and experimental psychology with Wilhelm Wundt. Kraepelin would be a disciple of Wundt and had a lifelong interest in experimental psychology based on his theories. While there, Kraepelin wrote a prize-winning essay, "The Influence of Acute Illness in the Causation of Mental Disorders".

In Würzburg, he completed his Rigorosum (roughly equivalent to a PhD level viva-voce examination, literally "rigorous exam") in March 1878, his Staatsexamen (licensing examination) in July 1878, and his Approbation (his license to practice medicine; roughly equivalent to an MBBS) on 9 August 1878. From August 1878 to 1882, he worked with Bernhard von Gudden at the Ludwig-Maximilians-Universität München.

Returning to the University of Leipzig in February 1882, he worked in Wilhelm Heinrich Erb's neurology clinic and in Wundt's psychopharmacology laboratory. He completed his habilitation thesis - major postdoc publication and process - at Leipzig; it was entitled "The Place of Psychology in Psychiatry". On 3 December 1883, he completed his umhabilitation (habilitation recognition procedure to obtain a "habilitation" at another institution than originally applied for) at the Ludwig-Maximilians-Universität München.

Kraepelin's major work, Compendium der Psychiatrie: Zum Gebrauche für Studirende und Aerzte (Compendium of Psychiatry: For the Use of Students and Physicians), was first published in 1883 and was expanded in subsequent multivolume editions to Ein Lehrbuch der Psychiatrie (A Textbook: Foundations of Psychiatry and Neuroscience). In it, he argued that psychiatry was a branch of medical science and should be investigated by observation and experimentation like the other natural sciences. He called for research into the physical causes of mental illness, and started to establish the foundations of the modern classification system for mental disorders. Kraepelin proposed that by studying case histories and identifying specific disorders, the progression of mental illness could be predicted, after taking into account individual differences in personality and patient age at the onset of disease.

In 1884, he became senior physician in the Prussian provincial town of Leubus, Silesia Province, and the following year he was appointed director of the Treatment and Nursing Institute in Dresden. On 1 July 1886, at the age of 30, Kraepelin was named Professor of Psychiatry at the Imperial University of Dorpat (today the University of Tartu) in what is today Tartu, Estonia (see Burgmair et al., vol. IV). Four years later, on 5 December 1890, he became department head at the University of Heidelberg, where he remained until 1904. While at Dorpat he became the director of the 80-bed University Clinic, where he began to study and record many clinical histories in detail and "was led to consider the importance of the course of the illness with regard to the classification of mental disorders".

In 1903, Kraepelin moved to Munich to become Professor of Clinical Psychiatry at the Ludwig-Maximilians-Universität München. In 1908, he was elected a member of the Royal Swedish Academy of Sciences. In 1912, at the request of the DVP (Deutscher Verein für Psychiatrie; German Association for Psychiatry), of which he was the head from 1906 to 1920, he began plans to establish a centre for research. Following a large donation from the Jewish German-American banker James Loeb, who had at one time been a patient, and promises of support from "patrons of science", the German Institute for Psychiatric Research was founded in 1917 in Munich. Initially housed in existing hospital buildings, it was maintained by further donations from Loeb and his relatives. In 1924 it came under the auspices of the Kaiser Wilhelm Society for the Advancement of Science. The German-American Rockefeller family's Rockefeller Foundation made a large donation enabling the development of a new dedicated building for the institute along Kraepelin's guidelines, which was officially opened in 1928.

Kraepelin spoke out against the barbarous treatment that was prevalent in the psychiatric asylums of the time, and crusaded against alcohol, capital punishment and the imprisonment rather than treatment of the insane. For the sedation of agitated patients, Kraepelin recommended potassium bromide. He rejected psychoanalytical theories that posited innate or early sexuality as the cause of mental illness, and he rejected philosophical speculation as unscientific. He focused on collecting clinical data and was particularly interested in neuropathology (e.g., diseased tissue).

He also firmly rejected the assumption of natural difference in relation to homosexuality, which he regarded as a vice caused by masturbation. In 1918 he called for "educational discipline": severe punishments for the crime of 'corruption' (seduction), applicable to any act related to sexual gratification. This extended the anti-gay policy of the time, which only punished sexual intercourse between men. These ideas eventually went on to lend legitimacy to Nazi policies that persecuted gay men, allowing the Nazi party to do so under the guise of conforming to scientific opinions. His work legitimized the persecution and inhumane treatment of gay people in Nazi Germany.

In the later period of his career, as a convinced champion of social Darwinism, he actively promoted a policy and research agenda in racial hygiene and eugenics. Kraepelin retired from teaching at the age of 66, spending his remaining years establishing the institute. The ninth and final edition of his Textbook was published in 1927, shortly after his death. It comprised four volumes and was ten times larger than the first edition of 1883. In the last years of his life, Kraepelin was preoccupied with Buddhist teachings and was planning to visit Buddhist shrines at the time of his death, according to his daughter, Antonie Schmidt-Kraepelin.

== Theories and classification schemes ==
Kraepelin announced that he had found a new way of looking at mental illness, referring to the traditional view as "symptomatic" and to his view as "clinical". This turned out to be his paradigm-setting synthesis of the hundreds of mental disorders classified by the 19th century, grouping diseases together based on classification of syndrome—common patterns of symptoms over time—rather than by simple similarity of major symptoms in the manner of his predecessors. Kraepelin described his work in the 5th edition of his textbook as a "decisive step from a symptomatic to a clinical view of insanity. ... The importance of external clinical signs has ... been subordinated to consideration of the conditions of origin, the course, and the terminus which result from individual disorders. Thus, all purely symptomatic categories have disappeared from the nosology".

=== Psychosis and mood ===
Kraepelin is specifically credited with the classification of what was previously considered to be a unitary concept of psychosis, into two distinct forms (known as the Kraepelinian dichotomy):

- manic depression (although commonly presented as synonym with bipolar disorder that is inaccurate; manic depressive illness encompasses a broader spectrum of mood disorders such as bipolar disorder and recurrent major depression.
- dementia praecox.

Drawing on his long-term research, and using the criteria of course, outcome and prognosis, he developed the concept of dementia praecox, which he defined as the "sub-acute development of a peculiar simple condition of mental weakness occurring at a youthful age". When he first introduced this concept as a diagnostic entity in the fourth German edition of his Lehrbuch der Psychiatrie in 1893, it was placed among the degenerative disorders alongside, but separate from, catatonia and dementia paranoides. At that time, the concept corresponded by and large with Ewald Hecker's hebephrenia. In the sixth edition of the Lehrbuch in 1899 all three of these clinical types are treated as different expressions of one disease, dementia praecox.

One of the cardinal principles of his method was the recognition that any given symptom may appear in virtually any one of these disorders; e.g., there is almost no single symptom occurring in dementia praecox which cannot sometimes be found in manic depression. What distinguishes each disease symptomatically (as opposed to the underlying pathology) is not any particular (pathognomonic) symptom or symptoms, but a specific pattern of symptoms. In the absence of a direct physiological or genetic test or marker for each disease, it is only possible to distinguish them by their specific pattern of symptoms. Thus, Kraepelin's system is a method for pattern recognition, not grouping by common symptoms.

It has been claimed that Kraepelin also demonstrated specific patterns in the genetics of these disorders and patterns in their course and outcome, but no specific biomarkers have yet been identified. Generally speaking, there tend to be more people with schizophrenia among the relatives of schizophrenic patients than in the general population, while manic depression is more frequent in the relatives of manic depressives. Though, of course, this does not demonstrate genetic linkage, as this might be a socio-environmental factor as well.

He also reported a pattern to the course and outcome of these conditions. Kraepelin believed that schizophrenia had a deteriorating course in which mental function continuously (although perhaps erratically) declines, while manic-depressive patients experienced a course of illness which was intermittent, where patients were relatively symptom-free during the intervals which separate acute episodes. This led Kraepelin to name what we now know as schizophrenia, dementia praecox (the dementia part signifying the irreversible mental decline). It later became clear that dementia praecox did not necessarily lead to mental decline and was thus renamed schizophrenia by Eugen Bleuler to correct Kraepelin's misnomer.

In addition, as Kraepelin accepted in 1920, "It is becoming increasingly obvious that we cannot satisfactorily distinguish these two diseases"; however, he maintained that "On the one hand we find those patients with irreversible dementia and severe cortical lesions. On the other are those patients whose personality remains intact". Nevertheless, overlap between the diagnoses and neurological abnormalities (when found) have continued, and in fact a diagnostic category of schizoaffective disorder would be brought in to cover the intermediate cases.

Kraepelin devoted very few pages to his speculations about the etiology of his two major insanities, dementia praecox and manic-depressive insanity. However, from 1896 to his death in 1926 he held to the speculation that these insanities (particularly dementia praecox) would one day probably be found to be caused by a gradual systemic or "whole body" disease process, probably metabolic, which affected many of the organs and nerves in the body but affected the brain in a final, decisive cascade.

=== Psychopathic personalities ===
In the first through sixth edition of Kraepelin's influential psychiatry textbook, there was a section on moral insanity, which meant then a disorder of the emotions or moral sense without apparent delusions or hallucinations, and which Kraepelin defined as "lack or weakness of those sentiments which counter the ruthless satisfaction of egotism". He attributed this mainly to degeneration. This has been described as a psychiatric redefinition of Cesare Lombroso's theories of the "born criminal", conceptualised as a "moral defect", though Kraepelin stressed it was not yet possible to recognise them by physical characteristics.

In fact from 1904 Kraepelin changed the section heading to "The born criminal", moving it from under "Congenital feeble-mindedness" to a new chapter on "Psychopathic personalities". They were treated under a theory of degeneration. Four types were distinguished: born criminals (inborn delinquents), pathological liars, querulous persons, and Triebmenschen (persons driven by a basic compulsion, including vagabonds, spendthrifts, and dipsomaniacs).

The concept of "psychopathic inferiorities" had been recently popularised in Germany by Julius Ludwig August Koch, who proposed congenital and acquired types. Kraepelin had no evidence or explanation suggesting a congenital cause, and his assumption therefore appears to have been simple "biologism". Others, such as Gustav Aschaffenburg, argued for a varying combination of causes. Kraepelin's assumption of a moral defect rather than a positive drive towards crime has also been questioned, as it implies that the moral sense is somehow inborn and unvarying, yet it was known to vary by time and place, and Kraepelin never considered that the moral sense might just be different.

Kurt Schneider criticized Kraepelin's nosology on topics such as Haltlose for appearing to be a list of behaviors that he considered undesirable, rather than medical conditions, though Schneider's alternative version has also been criticised on the same basis. Nevertheless, many essentials of these diagnostic systems were introduced into the diagnostic systems, and remarkable similarities remain in the DSM-5 and ICD-10. The issues would today mainly be considered under the category of personality disorders, or in terms of Kraepelin's focus on psychopathy.

Kraepelin had referred to psychopathic conditions (or "states") in his 1896 edition, including compulsive insanity, impulsive insanity, homosexuality, and mood disturbances. From 1904, however, he instead termed those "original disease conditions, and introduced the new alternative category of psychopathic personalities. In the eighth edition from 1909 that category would include, in addition to a separate "dissocial" type, the excitable, the unstable, the Triebmenschen driven persons, eccentrics, the liars and swindlers, and the quarrelsome. It has been described as remarkable that Kraepelin now considered mood disturbances to be not part of the same category, but only attenuated (more mild) phases of manic depressive illness; this corresponds to current classification schemes.

=== Alzheimer's disease ===
Kraepelin postulated that there is a specific brain or other biological pathology underlying each of the major psychiatric disorders. As a colleague of Alois Alzheimer, he was a co-discoverer of Alzheimer's disease, and his laboratory discovered its pathological basis. Kraepelin was confident that it would someday be possible to identify the pathological basis of each of the major psychiatric disorders.

=== Eugenics ===
Upon moving to become Professor of Clinical Psychiatry at the Ludwig-Maximilians-Universität München in 1903, Kraepelin increasingly wrote on social policy issues. He was a strong and influential proponent of eugenics and racial hygiene. His publications included a focus on alcoholism, crime, degeneration and hysteria.

Kraepelin was convinced that such institutions as the education system and the welfare state, because of their trend to break the processes of natural selection, undermined the Germans' biological "struggle for survival". He was concerned to preserve and enhance the German people, the Volk, in the sense of nation or race. He appears to have held Lamarckian concepts of evolution, such that cultural deterioration could be inherited. He was a strong ally and promoter of the work of fellow psychiatrist (and pupil and later successor as director of the clinic) Ernst Rüdin to clarify the mechanisms of genetic inheritance as to make a so-called "empirical genetic prognosis".

Martin Brune has pointed out that Kraepelin and Rüdin also appear to have been ardent advocates of a self-domestication theory, a version of social Darwinism which held that modern culture was not allowing people to be weeded out, resulting in more mental disorder and deterioration of the gene pool. Kraepelin saw a number of "symptoms" of this, such as "weakening of viability and resistance, decreasing fertility, proletarianisation, and moral damage due to "penning up people" [Zusammenpferchung]. He also wrote that "the number of idiots, epileptics, psychopaths, criminals, prostitutes, and tramps who descend from alcoholic and syphilitic parents, and who transfer their inferiority to their offspring, is incalculable". He felt that "the well-known example of the Jews, with their strong disposition towards nervous and mental disorders, teaches us that their extraordinarily advanced domestication may eventually imprint clear marks on the race". Brune states that Kraepelin's nosological system "was, to a great deal, built on the degeneration paradigm".

== Influence ==
Kraepelin's great contribution in classifying schizophrenia and manic depression remains relatively unknown to the general public, and his work, which had neither the literary quality nor paradigmatic power of Freud's, is little read outside scholarly circles. Kraepelin's contributions were also to a large extent marginalized throughout a good part of the 20th century during the success of Freudian etiological theories. However, his views now dominate many quarters of psychiatric research and academic psychiatry. His fundamental theories on the diagnosis of psychiatric disorders form the basis of the major diagnostic systems in use today, especially the American Psychiatric Association's DSM-IV and the World Health Organization's ICD system, based on the Research Diagnostic Criteria and earlier Feighner Criteria developed by espoused "neo-Kraepelinians", though Robert Spitzer and others in the DSM committees were keen not to include assumptions about causation as Kraepelin had.

Kraepelin has been described as a "scientific manager" and political operator, who developed a large-scale, clinically oriented, epidemiological research programme. In this role he took in clinical information from a wide range of sources and networks. Despite proclaiming high clinical standards for himself to gather information "by means of expert analysis of individual cases", he would also draw on the reported observations of officials not trained in psychiatry. The various editions of his textbooks do not contain detailed case histories of individuals, however, but mosaiclike compilations of typical statements and behaviors from patients with a specific diagnosis.

Kraepelin wrote in a knapp und klar (concise and clear) style that made his books useful tools for physicians. Abridged and clumsy English translations of the sixth and seventh editions of his textbook in 1902 and 1907 (respectively) by Allan Ross Diefendorf (1871–1943), an assistant physician at the Connecticut Hospital for the Insane at Middletown, inadequately conveyed the literary quality of his writings that made them so valuable to practitioners.

Among the doctors trained by Alois Alzheimer and Emil Kraepelin in Munich at the beginning of the 20th century were the Spanish neuropathologists and neuropsychiatrists Nicolás Achúcarro and Gonzalo Rodríguez Lafora, two distinguished disciples of Santiago Ramón y Cajal and members of the Spanish Neurological School.

== Dreaming for psychiatry's sake ==
In the Heidelberg and early Munich years, he edited Psychologische Arbeiten, a journal on experimental psychology. One of his own famous contributions to this journal also appeared in the form of a monograph (105 pp.) entitled Über Sprachstörungen im Traume (On Language Disturbances in Dreams). Kraepelin, on the basis of the dream-psychosis analogy, studied for more than 20 years language disorder in dreams in order to study indirectly schizophasia. The dreams Kraepelin collected are mainly his own. They lack extensive comment by the dreamer. In order to study them the full range of biographical knowledge available today on Kraepelin is necessary (see, e.g., Burgmair et al., I-IX).

== Bibliography ==
- Kraepelin, E. (1906). Über Sprachstörungen im Traume. Leipzig: Engelmann. ( Online.)
- Kraepelin, E. (1987). Memoirs. Berlin, Heidelberg, New York: Springer-Verlag. ISBN 978-3-642-71926-4.

=== Collected works ===
- Burgmair, Wolfgang & Eric J. Engstrom & Matthias Weber et al., eds. Emil Kraepelin. 9 vols. Munich: belleville, 2000–2019.
  - Vol. I: Persönliches, Selbstzeugnisse (2000), ISBN 3-933510-90-2
  - Vol. II: Kriminologische und forensische Schriften: Werke und Briefe (2001), ISBN 3-933510-91-0
  - Vol. III: Briefe I, 1868–1886 (2002), ISBN 3-933510-92-9
  - Vol. IV: Kraepelin in Dorpat, 1886–1891 (2003), ISBN 3-933510-93-7
  - Vol. V: Kraepelin in Heidelberg, 1891–1903 (2005), ISBN 3-933510-94-5
  - Vol. VI: Kraepelin in München I: 1903–1914 (2006), ISBN 3-933510-95-3
  - Vol. VII: Kraepelin in München II: 1914–1920 (2009), ISBN 978-3-933510-96-9
  - Vol. VIII: Kraepelin in München III: 1921–1926 (2013), ISBN 978-3-943157-22-2
  - Vol. IX: Briefe und Dokumente II: 1876-1926 (2019), ISBN 978-3-946875-28-4

== See also ==
- Kraepelinian dichotomy
- Comparison of bipolar disorder and schizophrenia
- History of bipolar disorder
- History of schizophrenia
- Lunatic asylum
- Psychiatric hospital

== Sources ==
- Noll, Richard (2011) American Madness: The Rise and Fall of Dementia Praecox. Cambridge and London: Harvard University Press.
- Briole G (2012). "Emil Kraepelin: The Fragility of a Colossal Oeuvre". Hurly-Burly. 8: 125–147.
