= Robert Howard (psychiatrist) =

British psychiatry professor (born 1961)

Robert Howard MRCPsych
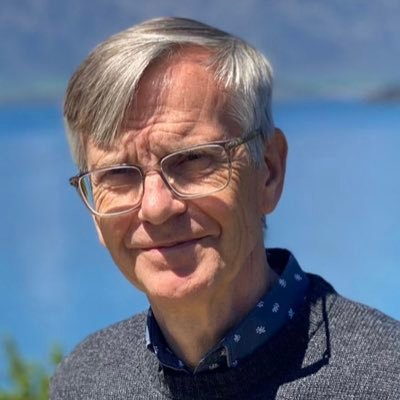
- Dr Robert Howard
- Born: 29 March 1961 (age 65)
- Education: University of Cambridge; St Bartholomew's Hospital Medical College
- Known for: VLOSLP consensus criteria; clinical trials CALM-AD, DOMINO, ATLAS, ATTILA, PATHFINDER & ANTLER 75+
- Spouse: Nesa Howard
- Children: 2
- Awards: Lifetime Achievement Award, Royal College of Psychiatrists (2019)
- Scientific career
- Fields: Old-age psychiatry
- Workplaces: University College London; North London Mental Health Partnership

Robert Howard (born 1961) is a British psychiatrist and professor of old-age psychiatry. He is professor of old age psychiatry at University College London (UCL) and an honorary consultant with the North London Mental Health Partnership. He co-defined the diagnostic criteria for very-late-onset schizophrenia-like psychosis (VLOSLP) and has led several influential clinical trials shaping dementia and psychosis care.

== Early life and education ==
Howard studied medicine at the University of Cambridge, completed clinical training at St Bartholomew's Hospital Medical College, and entered psychiatric training at the Maudsley Hospital/Institute of Psychiatry under mentors Raymond Levy, Klaus Bergmann and Tony David.

== Career ==
Howard worked as an academic psychiatrist from the 1990s at King's College London and then became professor of old age psychiatry and psychopathology from 2002 - 2014. Since 2015 he has been professor of old age psychiatry at UCL. From 2008 – 2011 he served as Dean of Royal College of Psychiatrists. He was also the originator of the Psychiatry in Pictures series in the British Journal of Psychiatry, which began in July 2001 and later featured on the journal's covers.

== Research ==
Howard has conducted many studies in old-age psychiatry, especially dementia and late-onset psychosis and depression.

As of 2025, he has published over 500 peer-reviewed articles, with an h-index of 105, and has led multiple landmark randomized controlled trials (RCTs) that shaped UK dementia and psychosis care policy.

His most influential RCTs are summarised in the table below.

| Trial | Focus | Key findings | Year | Reference |
|---|---|---|---|---|
| CALM-AD | Donepezil for agitation in Alzheimer's disease(AD) | No superiority over placebo for agitation | 2007 | |
| DOMINO | Continuation of donepezil ± addition of memantine in moderate–severe AD | Continuing donepezil sustained cognitive & functional benefit | 2012 | |
| ATLAS | Low-dose amisulpride for VLOSLP | Significant symptom reduction; good tolerability | 2018 | |
| MADE | Minocycline for mild AD | No benefit detected at either 200 mg or 400 mg dose; minocycline not recommended | 2020 | |
| ATTILA | Tailored assistive technology and telecare in people with dementia | No extension of time to institutionalisation | 2021 | |
| PATHFINDER | Problem Adaptation Therapy for depression in mild-moderate AD | No sustained benefit at 6 months | 2024 | |
| ANTLER 75+ (ongoing) | Antidepressant continuation vs discontinuation (≥ 75 years) | Multicentre RCT; results due 2027 | 2024– | |

Howard also has supervised or mentored clinical researchers in areas of psychiatry and neuroscience, including pharmacology, neuroimaging, epidemiology, neuropathology, cognitive neuroscience, biomarkers, and the use of technology in mental health care. These include Suzanne Reeves, Rebecca L. Gould, Nigel J. Blackwood, Derek K. Jones, Jonathan D. Huntley, Kathy Y. Liu, Jean Stafford, Harry Costello, Jemma Hazan, and Yuto Satake.

== Personal life ==
Howard lives in London and has a Jack Russell terrier named Layla.

== Selected publications ==
- Howard R et al. (2000). "Late-Onset Schizophrenia and Very-Late-Onset Schizophrenia-Like Psychosis: An International Consensus" Am J Psychiatry.
- Howard R et al. (2007). "Donepezil for the Treatment of Agitation in Alzheimer's Disease" N Engl J Med.
- Howard R et al. (2012). "Donepezil and Memantine for Moderate-to-Severe Alzheimer's Disease" N Engl J Med.
- Howard R et al. (2018). "Antipsychotic treatment of very late-onset schizophrenia-like psychosis (ATLAS): a randomised, controlled, double-blind trial" Lancet Psychiatry.
- Howard R et al. (2024). "Adapted problem adaptation therapy for depression in mild to moderate Alzheimer's disease dementia: A randomized controlled trial" Lancet Psychiatry.

== Books ==
- Presumed Curable: An Illustrated Casebook of Victorian Psychiatric Patients in Bethlem Hospital (with Colin Gale, 2003)

== Media ==
- Channel 4 documentary series "Bedlam" (2013)
- BBC "Who Do You Think You Are?" (2019)
- BBC One "Breakfast" (2025)

Howard has also contributed to many other television, radio and print media outlets on topics related to psychiatry and dementia.

== Honours ==
- Trustee, Bethlem Museum of the Mind (since 2013)
- Lifetime Achievement Award in Older People's Mental Health, Faculty of Old Age Psychiatry, Royal College of Psychiatrists (2019)
