= Karl Ludwig Kahlbaum =

German psychiatrist (1828–1899)

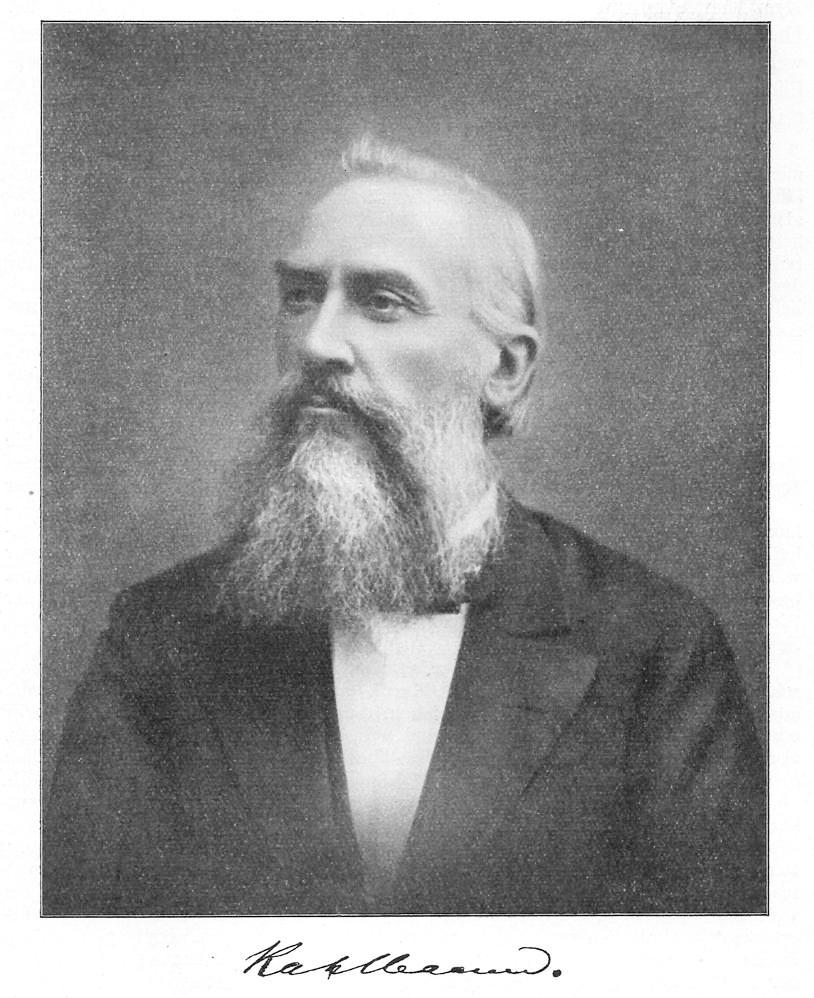
- Born: 28 December 1828; Driesen, Brandenburg, Prussia (present-day Drezdenko, Poland)
- Died: 15 April 1899 (aged 70); Görlitz, Silesia, Prussia, German Empire

Karl Ludwig Kahlbaum (28 December 1828 – 15 April 1899) was a German psychiatrist.

== Life and career ==
In 1855 he received his medical doctorate at Berlin, and subsequently worked as a physician at the mental asylum in Wehlau. For a period he was also a lecturer at the University of Königsberg (1863–66), and from 1867 was director of the mental hospital at Görlitz. He would remain at Görlitz for the remainder of his life.

As a psychiatrist, Kahlbaum realized that attempting to group mental disorders based on similarities of outward symptoms was futile, and in his work tried to develop a classification system that grouped mental diseases according to their course and outcome. He is remembered for research done at Görlitz with his associate Ewald Hecker (1843–1909) involving studies of young psychotic patients. In their analyses of mental disorders, Kahlbaum and Hecker introduced a classification system that used descriptive terms such as dysthymia, cyclothymia, catatonia, paraphrenia and hebephrenia. In their research they were pioneers in the application of modern clinical practices in the study of mental health.

Kahlbaum referred to Jugendliche Irresein or "juvenile madness", and stressed the importance of parental upbringing to prevent this condition from occurring. In his research of catatonia, he published the monograph, Die Katatonie oder das Spannungsirresein, in which he characterizes the disorder as disturbance in motor functionality that represents a phase in a progressive illness that includes stages of mania, depression and psychosis that typically ends in dementia.

Kahlbaum's work would in time influence German psychiatrist Emil Kraepelin. Strictly speaking however Kahlbaum's catatonia is not, as is commonly believed, the same as the catatonia found in Emil Kraepelin's concept of dementia praecox. Rather, as Adolf Meyer would later complain with respect to dementia praecox, "Kahlbaum's catatonia was liberally extended so as to include everything that showed catalepsy, negativism, automatism, stereotypy, and verbigeration" (Meyer, 1910, p. 276).

As the 20th century came to its close, the American Psychiatric Association (APA) would declare that occurrences of catatonia were, by 1987, rare (APA, 1987).

The eponymous "Kahlbaum's syndrome" is a catatonic symptom characterized by continuous and purposeless rhythmic repetition of words and sentences that are meaningless or insignificant (echolalia).

== Scientific works ==
- "De avium tractus alimentarii anatomia et histologia nonnulla". (Doctoral dissertation), Berlin, 1854.
- Die Gruppierung der psychischen Krankheiten und die Einteilung der Seelenstörungen. Danzig: Verlag von A. W. Kafemann. 1863. p. 182.
- "Die Sinnesdelierien. Ein Beitrag zur klinischen Erweiterung der psychiatrischen Symptomatologie und zur physiologischen Psychologie". Allgemeine Zeitschrift für Psychiatrie und psychisch-gerichtliche Medicin (in German). Bd. 23. Berlin: Verlag von August Hirschwald: 1–86. 1866.
- "Die Katatonie oder das Spannungsirresein", 1874.
- "Über jugendliche Nerven– und Gemütskranke und ihre pädagogische Behandlung in der Anstalt". In Allgemeine Zeitschrift für Psychiatrie, Berlin, 1884, H. 44.
- "Die klinisch-diagnostischen Gesichtspunkte der Pathologie"; In Volkmann's Sammlung klinischer Vorträge, Leipzig, 1878, Nr. 126.
