= Ewald Hecker =

German psychiatrist (1843–1909)

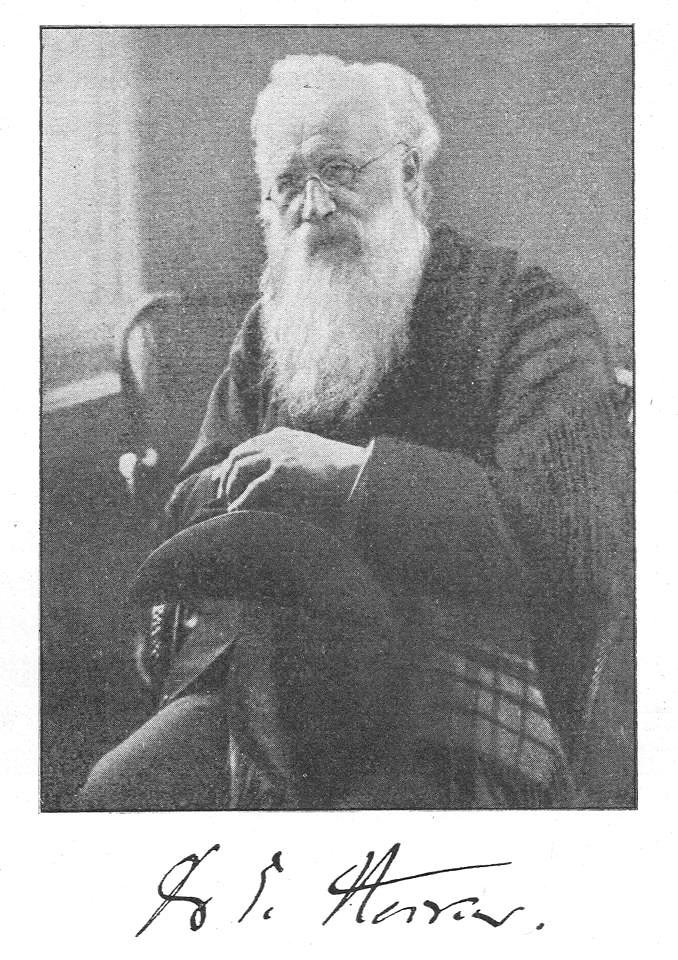
Ewald Hecker.

Ewald Hecker (20 October 1843, Halle – 11 January 1909, Wiesbaden) was a German psychiatrist who was an important figure in the early days of modern psychiatry. He is known for research done with his mentor, psychiatrist Karl Ludwig Kahlbaum (1828-1899).

In the early 1870s Kahlbaum and Hecker did a series of studies on young psychotic patients at Kahlbaum's clinic in Görlitz, Prussia. Together they provided clinical analyses of the mentally ill, and arranged their disorders into specific, descriptive categories. It was during this period that Hecker developed the concepts of hebephrenia and cyclothymia. He described hebephrenia as a disorder that begins in adolescence with erratic behaviour followed by a rapid decline of all mental functions, and cyclothymia as a cyclical mood disorder.

The pioneering research of Kahlbaum and Hecker proposed the existence of more than one discrete psychiatric disorder, which contrasted with the concept of "unitary psychosis" that maintained all psychiatric symptoms were manifestations of a single mental disorder.

Hecker had progressive ideas concerning treatment of the mentally ill, and was an advocate in establishing a humane environment for mental patients. In 1891 he purchased a private psychiatric hospital in Wiesbaden.
