= Disorganized schizophrenia =

Obsolete subcategory of schizophrenia

- Other names: Hebephrenic schizophrenia, hebephrenia
- Specialty: Psychiatry

Disorganized schizophrenia is an obsolete subtype of schizophrenia. It is no longer diagnosed as a separate condition in DSM-5 and ICD-11, two diagnostic manuals published in 2013 and 2022, respectively.

Disorganized schizophrenia was classified up to DSM-IV and ICD-10 as a mental and behavioural disorder, because the classification was thought to be an extreme expression of the disorganization syndrome that has been hypothesized to be one aspect of a three-factor model of symptoms in schizophrenia, the other factors being reality distortion (involving delusions and hallucinations) and psychomotor poverty (lack of speech, lack of spontaneous movement and various aspects of blunting of emotion). It is considered to have relatively poor prognosis.

== History ==
German psychiatrist Ewald Hecker first proposed the condition in the 1870s under the term hebephrenia, from Greek ἥβη (hḗbē) for adolescence, and -phrenia for mental disorder. The name referred to the ostensibly more prominent appearance of the disorder in teenagers and young adults.

== Symptoms ==
In DSM-IV, the subtype was characterised by disorganized speech, behaviour, and flat or inappropriate affect, and diagnosed based on symptoms only. Disorganized speech, e.g., word salads, reflects an individual's underlying thought disorder; where an individual with disorganized behaviour may struggle to carry out normal daily activities. Inappropriate affect display is the outward presentation of one's emotions that, given the circumstances under which it is performed, is perceived by social norms to be awkward, offensive or otherwise unacceptable.

The subtype was considered to be one in which these features were more prominent than in other types of schizophrenia, and affected individuals may carry more stigmatization.

== See also ==
- Catatonia
- Communication deviance
- Paranoid schizophrenia
