= Die transitorischen Störungen des Selbstbewusstseins =

1868 book by Richard von Krafft-Ebing

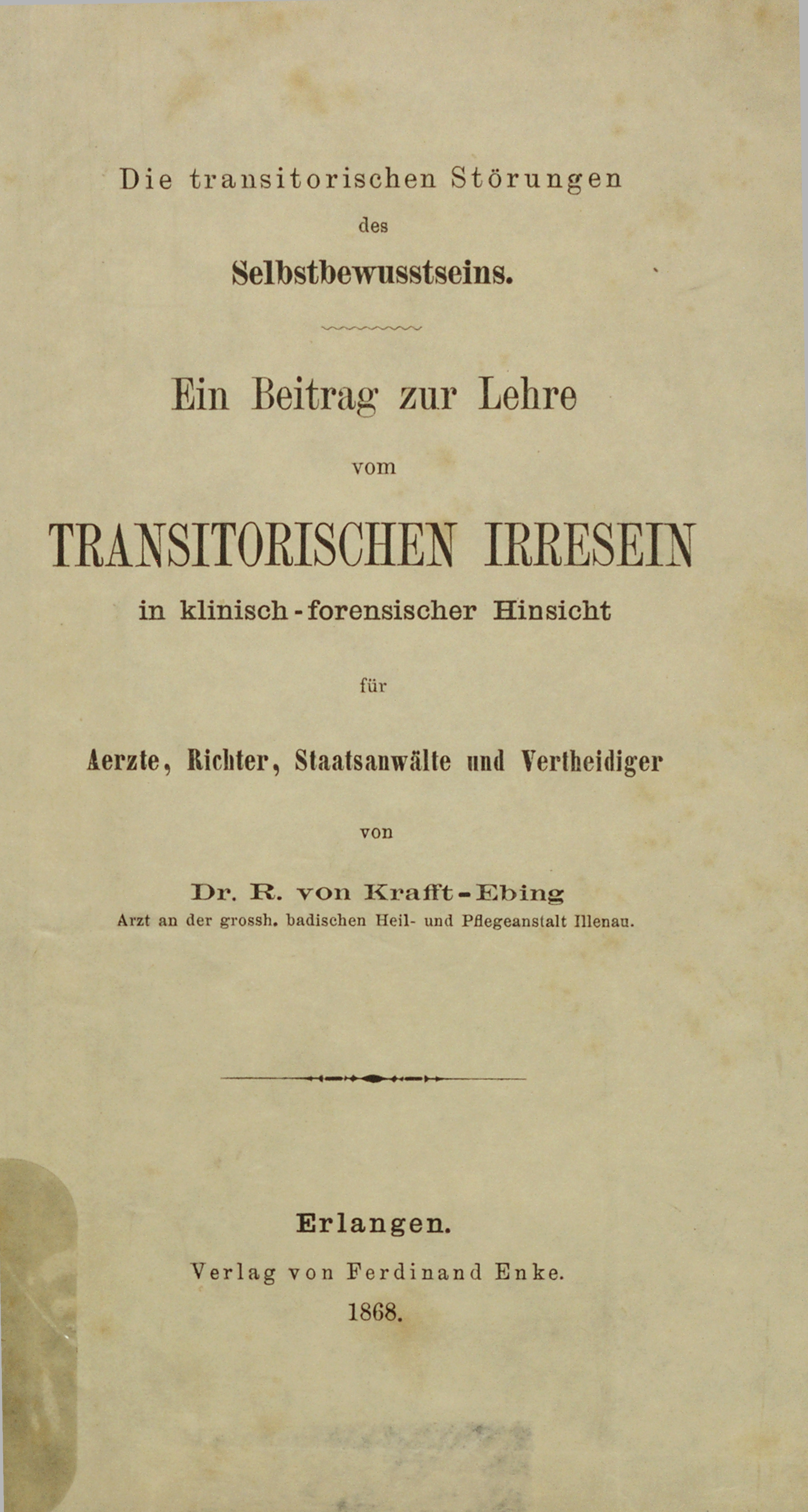
- Title page of the original German edition
- Author: Richard von Krafft-Ebing
- Original title: Die transitorischen Störungen des Selbstbewusstseins
- Language: German
- Genre: Forensic science, Case History
- Publisher: Ferdinand Enke, Erlangen
- Publication date: 1868
- Publication place: Germany
- Media type: Print
- Pages: 120 (first edition)

Die transitorischen Störungen des Selbstbewusstseins - Ein Beitrag zur Lehre vom Transitorischen Irresein in klinisch-forensischer Hinsicht für Aerzte, Richter, Staatsanwälte und Vertheidiger (English: Transitory Disorders of Consciousness) is an 1868 book by the Austro-German psychiatrist and author Richard von Krafft-Ebing (1840-1902). The book comprises seven chapters, each dealing with a different kind of transient disturbance of consciousness, and it is meant to be a handbook for physicians, judges, prosecutors and defenders. At the beginning of each chapter, Krafft-Ebing introduces the general theme and discusses its relevance in a clinical-forensic context. He then precedes with the illustration of several case histories for each subsection. The book was reprinted and published by Hansebooks in January 2017.

== Context ==
At the end of the 19th century, medicine and psychiatry was largely influenced by Bénédict Morel's degeneration theory. Degeneration was seen as weakening of higher brain regions that would allow more primitive and uncontrollable behavior to emerge. Proponents of this world view were convinced that a process of devolution was taking place in society and that the causes of this decline were rooted within biological causes. Inspired by evolutionary theories of Darwin and Lamarck, European degenerationists increasingly believed that mental disorders were disorders of heredity and therefore biologically determined. According to Morel, degeneration could be caused by several factors, including intoxication, social environment or mental illness. Although Krafft-Ebing himself was said to be a liberal and progressive psychiatrist, in many respects he was still a child of his time. He was a loyal supporter of Morel's ideology and advocated the idea that modern civilization posed enormous demands on the nervous system causing impulsive malfunctions. In 1879, he published his "Lehrbuch der Psychiatrie" (English: "Textbook of Insanity"), which would soon become the German bible of degeneration theory. He believed that alcohol abuse or immorality would cause lack of voluntary control in higher order brain functions which would consequently lead to so called moral insanity. With beginning of the 20th century and the end of the victorian era, degeneration theory began to lose its popularity and slowly paved the way for a multi-causal framework of mental illnesses.

== Content ==
The book comprises seven chapters, each devoted to a different altered state of consciousness and its sub-categories. At the beginning of each chapter, Krafft-Ebing defines each of those states and evaluates how they are related to each other. To underline his conclusions regarding the clinical-forensic context, he presents several case histories that he calls "Beobachtungen" (English: Observations) at the end of each chapter.

- I. Dream States: Krafft-Ebing sees dream states as the most frequent and well-known altered states of consciousness. During sleep, mental functions that are linked to our self-consciousness, like attention or conscious thought, are reduced or completely shut down while sensory input is blocked and motor commands are inhibited. At the same time, certain emotions lead to the production of sensory images that are experienced and perceived in this ASC. Somnolence, or drowsiness, refers to the state between sleep and wakefulness which is marked by reduced self-consciousness and apperceptive activity. Somnambulism, or sleepwalking, describes a state of low self-consciousness that is accompanied by the phenomenon of motor behavior in form of walking or talking during sleep. Due to the uninhibited triggering of motor movement outside of consciousness, actions performed in a somnambulate state are difficult to evaluate in terms of accountability for a crime and people may not be held responsible for their actions.
- II. States of Intoxication: Alcohol intoxication is a physiological state induced by the depressant ethanol (alcohol) that reduces arousal and stimulation in several areas of the brain. Krafft-Ebing describes that the legislator saw such a drug-induced state as self-inflicted and therefore, any unlawful action committed during intoxication should be seen as punishable. In contrast, physicians equated alcohol-induced states with those of mentally ill individuals (for example psychosis), and according to them, unlawful acts should be evaluated in the same light as mental disorders.
- III. Acute Delirium in States of Fever: An increased body temperature can alter brain functioning that may lead to temporary ASCs expressing themselves in a delirium or hallucinations. Affected individuals experience a state of emotionally frightening illusions that lead to acute states of anxiety and restlessness. Such a delirium is not insignificant in a forensic context, since there have been several cases reported in which feverish and delusional individuals committed a crime.
- IV. The Big Neuroses: Mania epileptica comprises several mental states of epileptics that cannot simply be described by mania. Such states often resemble those of manic patients, but can also be characterized by melancholia or depression, which often lead to suicide, homicide, arson or other types of unlawful actions. Likewise, Krafft-Ebing describes hysteria and dysthymia as two further states of altered consciousness, though different in nature. While hysteria is primarily marked by manic symptoms, dysthymic individuals are in a state of chronic depression.
- V. Transient Psychoses: Mania transitoria describes insanity of very short duration which may resemble the mania epileptica. In contrast to dysthymia, mania transitoria is more prevalent in males than in females and its onset is more sudden. In no less than 20 minutes to 6 hours, the symptoms of mania transitoria may appear and alter the state of consciousness in a way that the individual fully loses the sense of self. Another transient psychosis is raptus melancholicus, a term that has rarely been used in scientific or clinical discussions to date. Krafft-Ebing describes this altered state of consciousness as a state of extreme anxiety accompanied by symptoms of depression. Because affected individuals experience an intense feeling of restlessness, they see committing a serious crime as their only way to get rid of this negative energy. Such crimes most often include murder, mutilation, vandalism or suicide.
- VI. Pathological Affect of Sensory Confusion: Changes in physiological affect are a day-to-day phenomenon and according to Krafft-Ebing experienced by every individual. To a certain extent, these changes in effect are controllable and the administration of justice should consider whether a committed crime was evitable or not. Pathological affect is hard to distinguish from this physiological affect. Such mental state may become pathological due to lovesickness, jealousy or despair. In such cases, the judge alone cannot decide on the accountability for the crime and must consult a medical record of the accused.
- VII. Transient Disturbances of Self-Consciousness in Parturients: During childbirth or in a short time frame after, a woman may find herself in an altered state of consciousness that may lead to infanticide. In such cases, medical jurisprudence is of great importance, since medical evidence is often the only option to trace back the happening. These altered states of consciousness may be elicited by a huge amount of blood loss, anxiety or despair.

== Reception ==
Richard von Krafft-Ebing had the reputation of being one of the leading psychiatrist of his day. He was the author several leading textbooks in psychiatry and was especially known for his foundational work on Psychopathia Sexualis (1886) that had a wide and non-professional readership. Die transitorischen Störungen des Selbstbewusstseins is one of his less well known publications and did not get much public reaction in academia or press. In many instances, it is not even listed as one of his official publications. Nonetheless, in 2002 the German newspaper Der Tagesspiegel elected Krafft-Ebing as "Entdecker des Dämmerzustands" (English: Discoverer of the Twilight-State), to which the work on Die transitorischen Störungen des Selbstbewusstseins contributed the idea of altered states of consciousness. In 2016, Krafft-Ebings ideas on transitory disturbances of consciousness, especially epilepsy, were cited in an essay on "Transitorischer Wahnsinn" (English: Transitory Mania). Apart from that, most of the reviews on Krafft-Ebing's work concentrate on his publications on sexuality. That is because he soon shifted his attention from pre-dominantly lower socio-economic subjects of his asylum work to a different clientele.

== Insanity defence in the 21st century ==
Nowadays, criminal responsibility is usually presumed in cases of adult offenders. An indication for possible insanity defence can often only be given by a medical or psychiatric expert witness and is not solely based on the judgments of physicians, judges, prosecutors or defenders anymore. The evidence put forward by an expert witness is often a crucial judgment that leads to a well-informed and considered judgment. Further guidance is given by the German penal code (Strafgesetzbuch, StGB). According to §21, a mitigation of sentence can be considered when an offender lacks insight due to one of the reasons stated in §20. These include morbid mental disorders, like psychoses due to alcohol intoxication, or disorders of consciousness that can be due to fatigue, somnolence or parasomnia. In such cases, the offender cannot be held fully responsible for the criminal offense despite posing a possible threat to society. According to §63 and §64, the inculpable offender has to be accommodated in a psychiatric hospital (German: Maßregelvollzug) in which they are primarily treated as patients, not criminals. The main focus of therapy is "Besserung and Sicherung" (English: "Recovery and Safety") and in contrast to a prison sentence, the duration of stay is individually determined by improvement in mental stabilization and rehabilitation. The treatment usually extends over several years and the requirements of legal dismissal are high. Dismissal on probation is only feasible with a clear and favorable forecast by several forensic experts, including psychiatrists and physicians.

== See also ==
- Consciousness
- Altered state of consciousness
- Insanity defence
- Diminished responsibility

== Literature ==
- Krafft-Ebing, Richard. Die transitorischen Störungen des Selbstbewusstseins: Ein Beitrag zur Lehre vom transitorischen Irresein in klinisch-forensischer Hinsicht, für Aerzte, Richter, Staatsanwälte und Vertheidiger. Erlangen: F. Enke. (1868).
