= Chaddock =

Chaddock may refer to

- Charles Gilbert Chaddock (1861–1936), American neurologist
  - Chaddock reflex, described by Charles Gilbert Chaddock
- Chaddock Hall, a medieval hall house on Chaddock Lane, Tyldesley, Greater Manchester, England
- Chaddock College, a school for boys in Quincy, Illinois

== See also ==
- Chattock (disambiguation)
