= Boissy-sous-Saint-Yon =

Commune in Île-de-France, France

- Commune
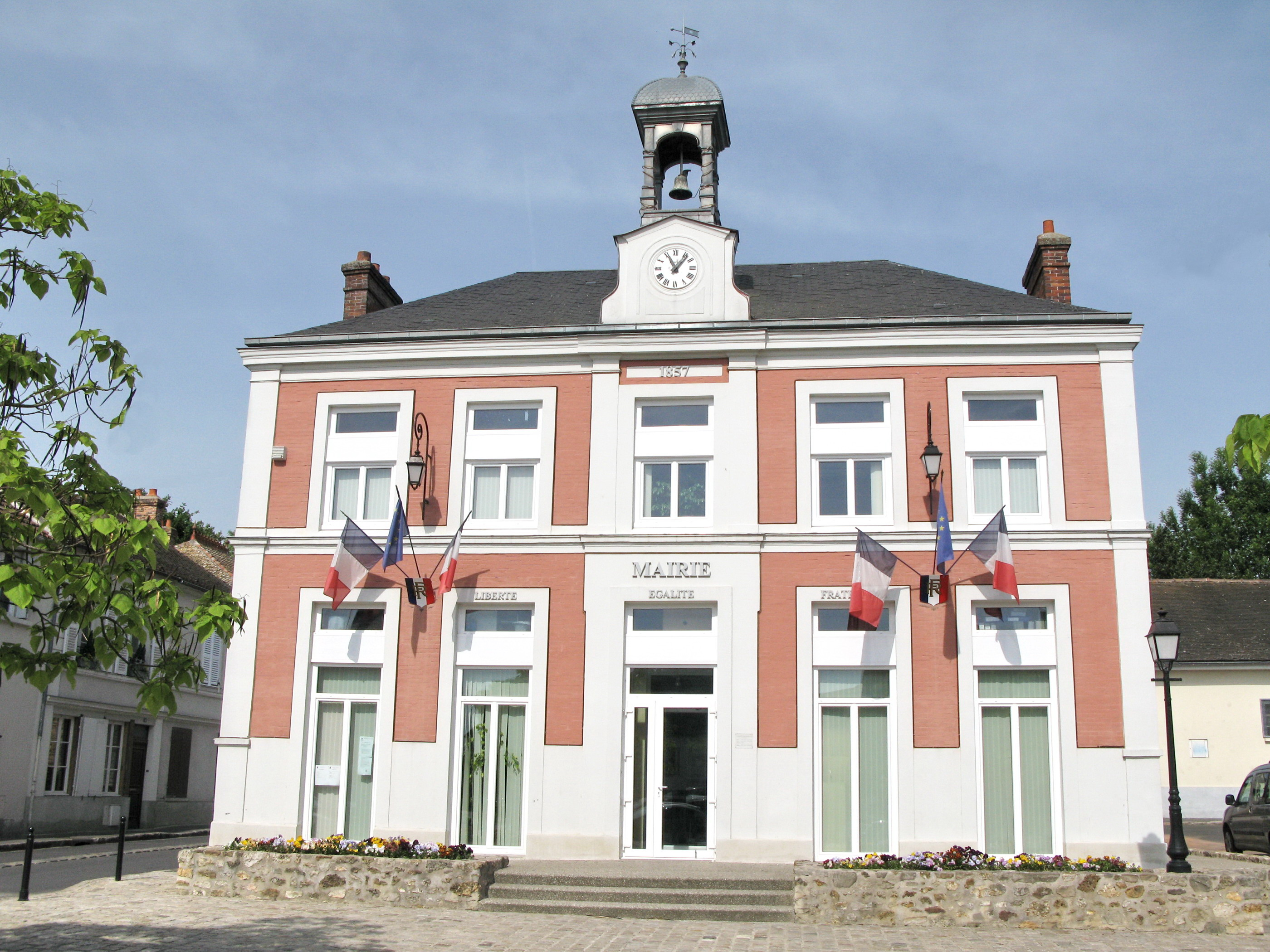
- The town hall of Boissy-sous-Saint-Yon

- Coat of arms
- Location of Boissy-sous-Saint-Yon
- Location within France Location within Île-de-France (region)
- Coordinates: 48°33′31″N 2°12′31″E
- Country: France
- Region: Île-de-France
- Department: Essonne
- Arrondissement: Étampes
- Canton: Arpajon
- Intercommunality: Entre Juine et Renarde

Government
  - Mayor (2023–2026): Jean-Marc Pichon
- Area^{1}: 8.04 km^{2} (3.10 sq mi)
- Highest elevation: 156 m (512 ft)
- Lowest elevation: 69 m (226 ft)
- Population (2023): 3,882
  - Density: 483/km^{2} (1,250/sq mi)
- Time zone: UTC+01:00 (CET)
  - Summer (DST): UTC+02:00 (CEST)
- INSEE/Postal code: 91085 /91790
- ^{1} French Land Register data, which excludes lakes, ponds, glaciers > 1 km^{2} (0.386 sq mi or 247 acres) and river estuaries.

Boissy-sous-Saint-Yon (French pronunciation: [bwasi su sɛ̃.t‿jɔ̃], literally Boissy under Saint-Yon) is a commune in the Essonne department in Île-de-France in northern France.

== Population ==
Historical population
Year	Pop.	±% p.a.
1968	1,017	—
1975	1,211	+2.53%
1982	2,543	+11.18%
1990	3,309	+3.35%
1999	3,566	+0.83%
2007	3,641	+0.26%
2012	3,696	+0.30%
2017	3,868	+0.91%
2023	3,882	+0.06%
Source: INSEE

Inhabitants of Boissy-sous-Saint-Yon are known as Buxéens in French.

== See also ==
- Communes of the Essonne department
