= Chattock =

Chattock may refer to

== People ==
- Richard Samuel Chattock (1825–1906), English painter and etcher
- Arthur Prince Chattock (1860–1934), British physicist
- John Osler Chattock Hayes (1913–1998), Royal Navy officer who became Naval Secretary

== See also ==
- Chaddock (disambiguation)
