= Textbook of Forensic Psychopathology =

1875 book by Richard von Krafft-Ebing

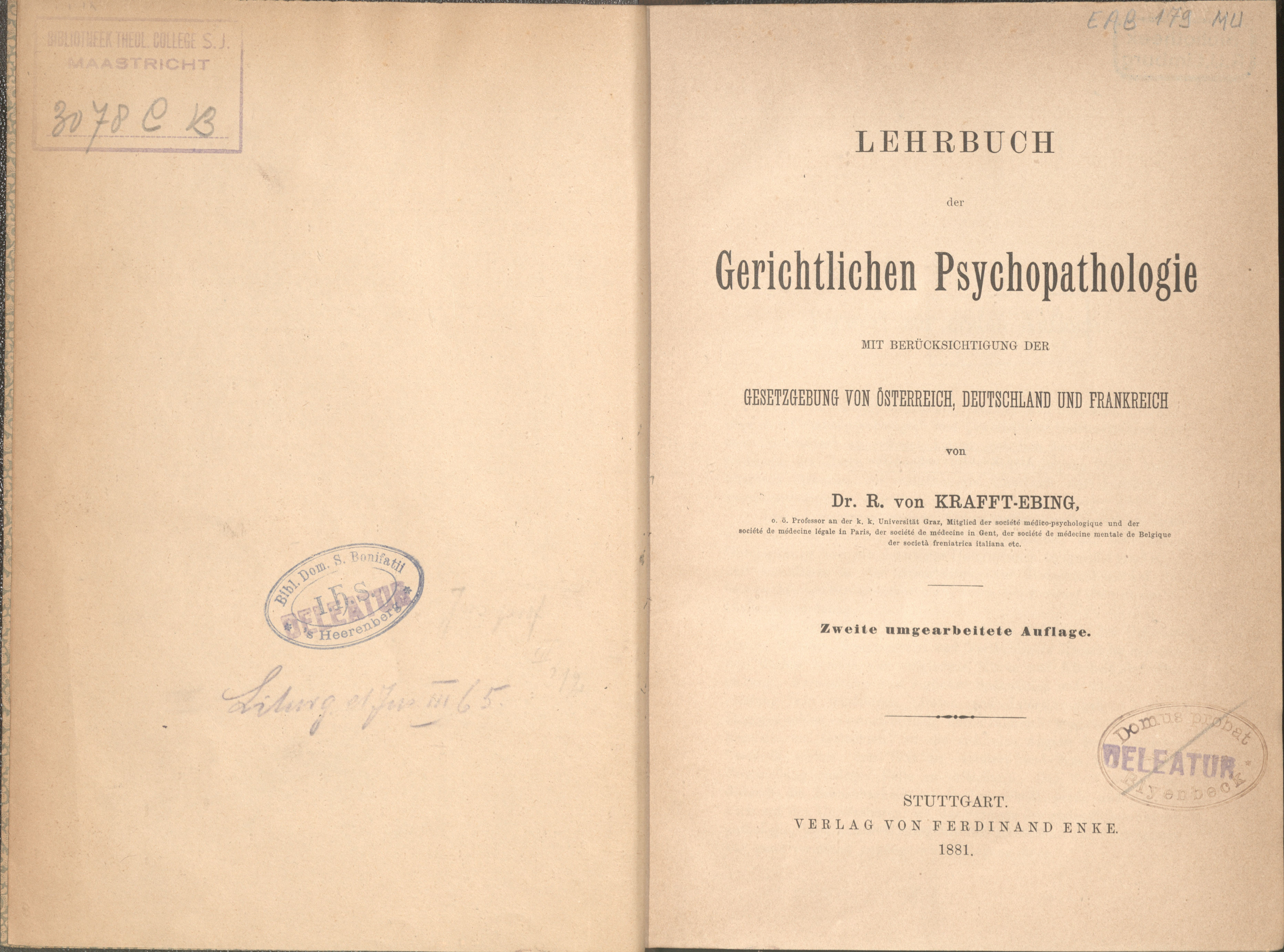
Lehrbuch der gerichtlichen Psychopathologie

Lehrbuch der gerichtlichen Psychopathologie mit Berücksichtigung der Gesetzgebung von Österreich, Deutschland und Frankreich (English: Textbook of Forensic Psychopathology: Considering the Legislation of Austria, Germany, and France) is a book written by Richard von Krafft-Ebing in 1875 with subsequent revisions in 1881 and 1892. The book examines the intersection of mental illness and criminal behavior and thereby provides a framework for understanding and assessing the psychological conditions of offenders within a legal context.

== Context ==
Until the Second World War the field of forensic psychology, where the psychological motives behind criminal acts were examined and their impact on legal responsibility was assessed, saw little development due to competition among various disciplines, including law, psychology, psychiatry, and pedagogy. In the late 19th century forensic psychopathology was still in its infancy. The discipline emerged in Europe in response to reforms in criminal procedure and research on suggestion both of which raised concerns about the reliability of witness testimony.

Krafft-Ebing studied medicine in Heidelberg and Zürich. He gained practical experience in the field of mental health while working as an assistant physician at the Baden State Mental Hospital Illenau from 1864 to 1868. In 1868, von Krafft-Ebing started working as an independent neurologist in Baden-Baden. In 1872, Krafft-Ebing became an associate professor of psychiatry at the new University of Strasbourg. In 1873 he left that position to take over as director of the Feldhof Mental Asylum in Graz where he also became a professor of psychiatry at the University of Graz. Krafft-Ebing made important contributions to psychiatry, particularly in the area of forensic psychopathology, through his many publications. His research also focused on exploring the connections between psychiatry and criminal law. For instance, in 1872 before becoming a professor of psychiatry at the University of Graz he published Grundzüge der Kriminalpsychologie ("Fundamentals of Criminal psychology"). That publication laid the foundation for his later work. One of his earliest major works was Lehrbuch der gerichtlichen Psychopathologie mit Berücksichtigung der Gesetzgebung von Österreich, Deutschland und Frankreich (English:Textbook of Forensic Psychopathology: Considering the Legislation of Austria, Germany, and France).

== Contents ==
The book is broadly divided into two main sections. The first, titled "Book 1", addresses the relationship between psychiatry and criminal law. The second, titled "Book 2", focuses on psychiatry's connection to civil law. Each of these sections is further divided into two parts. In both sections, "Part A" provides general and formal information to establish a foundation, while "Part B" delves into specific clinical issues.

In Part A of book 1 the author starts by clarifying some principles and addressing issues like free will, criminal responsibility and the importance of medical certification of mental illness. In Part B of Book 1 the author looks at specific clinical issues and discusses how various mental disorders intersect with criminal law and how psychiatric assessments can inform legal decisions in court. He also describes cases that are not classified as mental disorders. They involve individuals who cannot be held accountable for their actions. This includes, for example, situations where the offender is too young to fully understand the consequences of their actions. Part A of Book 2 focuses on the general principles of civil law as they relate to psychiatry. It addresses the legal implications of mental illness in civil cases, including issues of capacity, guardianship, and the ability to make legal decisions. The section gives a foundational understanding of how psychiatric evaluations are applied within the context of civil law. After that in Part B of Book 2 the author focuses on specific clinical issues and how they relate to civil law. The section looks at various mental conditions that can affect a person's legal capacity such as their ability to manage their affairs, enter into contracts, or make decisions about their property. The section also focuses on the role of psychiatric evaluations in determining a person's legal competence and the implications of these assessments in civil legal proceedings.

Throughout the book Kraft-Ebbing also includes observations that underscore and highlight the topics discussed in each section. These practical examples and case studies show the application of psychiatric principles in legal contexts and offer to the readers a clearer understanding of how theoretical concepts are applied in practice.

== Reception ==
The Textbook of Forensic Psychopathology was widely embraced and became a standard psychiatric textbook for Universities across Germany. Along with other works by the author like Fundamentals of criminal psychology and The clinical basis of psychiatry it became one of the most influential textbooks in the field of psychiatry in German Universities of the late nineteenth century.

Krafft-Ebing was acknowledged for pioneering the field of forensic psychology which was a discipline that was not yet recognized at the time. His work played a key role in placing it as a legitimate area of psychological study. Initially, the book helped building the importance of understanding the mental state of criminals within the legal system. The publication of the book led to a shift of focus of medicine and law from the crime itself to the person committing the crime which. The author thereby also accomplished to position the psychiatric experts alongside the judge in the courtroom. Over time, this field has expanded with advancements in psychological assessment techniques, neuropsychology, and a deeper understanding of mental disorders. Forensic psychology in the 21st century involves using psychology to understand and work on every part of the criminal justice system.

The Textbook of Forensic Psychopathology was not the author's most influential work. That belongs to a later publication of his, namely Psychopathia Sexualis in which Richard von Krafft-Ebing proposed viewing homosexuality as a medical condition and thereby advocating for its decriminalization. This book was criticized by many for openly addressing and justifying homosexuality. It was an uncommon and controversial topic during that time. Psychopathia Sexualis went through twelve revisions.
