= Bénédict Morel =

Austrian-born French psychiatrist (1809–1873)

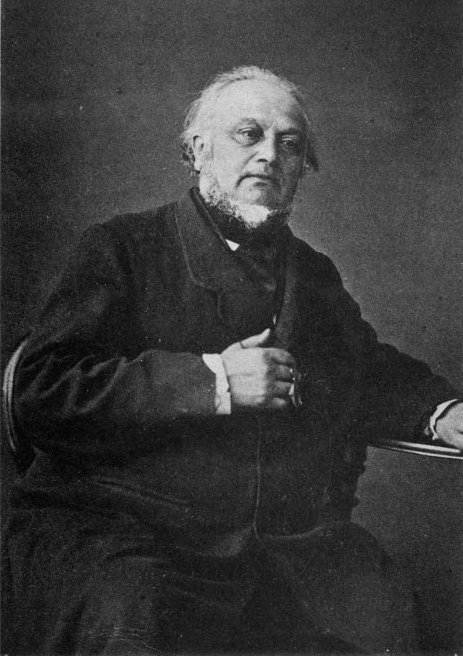
- Morel c. 1870
- Born: 22 November 1809; Vienna, Austrian Empire
- Died: 30 March 1873 (aged 63); Saint-Yon, France
- Scientific career
- Fields: psychiatry

Bénédict Augustin Morel (22 November 1809 – 30 March 1873) was a French psychiatrist born in Vienna, Austria. He was an influential figure in the field of degeneration theory during the mid-19th century.

== Biography ==
Morel was born in Vienna, Austria in 1809, of French parents. In the aftermath of the War of the Sixth Coalition Morel was abandoned by his parents, and left with the Luxembourgish Abbé Dupont and his servant Marianne, who raised him.

Morel received his education in Paris, and while a student, supplemented his income by teaching English and German classes. In 1839 he earned his medical doctorate, and two years later became an assistant to psychiatrist Jean-Pierre Falret (1794–1870) at the Salpêtrière in Paris.

Morel's interest in psychiatry was further enhanced in the mid-1840s when he visited several mental institutions throughout Europe. In 1848 he was appointed director of the Asile d'Aliénés de Maréville at Nancy. Here he introduced reforms towards the welfare of the mentally ill, in particular liberalization of restraining practices. At the Maréville asylum he studied people with mental disabilities, researching their family histories and investigating aspects such as poverty and childhood physical illnesses. In 1856 he was appointed director of the mental asylum at Saint-Yon in Rouen.

Morel, influenced by various pre-Darwinian theories of evolution, particularly those that attributed a powerful role to acclimation, saw mental deficiency as the end stage of a process of mental deterioration. In the 1850s, he developed a theory of "degeneration" in regards to mental problems that take place from early life to adulthood. In 1857 he published Traité des dégénérescences physiques, intellectuelles et morales de l'espèce humaine et des causes qui produisent ces variétés maladives, a treatise in which he explains the nature, causes, and indications of human degeneration. Morel looked for answers to mental illness in heredity, although he later believed that alcohol and drug usage could also be important factors in the course of mental decline.

== Démence précoce ==
In the first volume of his Études cliniques (1852) Morel used the term démence précoce in passing to describe the characteristics of a subset of young patients, and he employed the phrase more frequently in his textbook Traité des maladies mentales which was published in 1860. Morel used the term in a descriptive sense and not to define a specific and novel diagnostic category. It was applied as a means of setting apart a group of young men and women who had "stupor." As such their condition was characterised by a certain torpor, enervation, and disorder of the will and was related to the diagnostic category of melancholia. His understanding of dementia was a traditional and distinctly non-modern one in the sense that he did not conceptualise it as an irreversible state.

While some have sought to interpret, if in a qualified fashion, Morel's reference to démence précoce as amounting to the "discovery" of schizophrenia, others have argued convincingly that Morel's descriptive use of the term should not be considered in any sense as a precursor to the German psychiatrist Emil Kraepelin's dementia praecox disease concept. This is due to the fact that their concepts of dementia differed significantly from each other, with Kraepelin employing the more modern sense of the word, and also that Morel was not describing a diagnostic category. Indeed, until the advent of Arnold Pick and Kraepelin, Morel's term had vanished without a trace and there is little evidence to suggest that either Pick or indeed Kraepelin were even aware of Morel's use of the term until long after they had published their own disease concepts bearing the same name. As Eugène Minkowski succinctly stated, 'An abyss separates Morel's démence précoce from that of Kraepelin.'

== Degeneration theory ==
Morel is known for creating degeneration theory in the 1850s. He began to develop his theory while he was the director of the mental asylum at Saint-Yon in northern France. In 19th century France, there was an increase in crime, sickness, and mental disorders, which interested Morel. He was determined to identify the underlying causes of this increase. Morel's Catholic and radical political background greatly shaped his process. Morel noticed that the patients in the mental asylum with intellectual disability also had physical abnormalities like goiters. He was able to expand this idea when he noticed most people in the asylum had unusual physical characteristics. Morel's degeneration theory was based on the idea that psychological disorders and other behavioral abnormalities were caused by an abnormal constitution. This also meant that he believed that there was a perfect type of human that degenerations altered. He believed that these abnormalities could be inherited and that there was a progressive worsening of the degeneration by generation. These traits were not specified pathologies, but rather an overall abnormality like a highly susceptible nervous system to disturbances from excessive toxins. The first generation started with neurosis, then, in the next generation, mental alienation. After the second generation, the mental alienation led to imbecility. Finally, the fourth generation was destined to be sterile.

In Morel's theory, degeneration was synonymous with anything that was different from the natural or normal state. These abnormalities were caused by environmental influences like diet, disease, and moral depravities or traits that were passed from generation to generation like alcoholism and living in the slums. Due to the law of progressivity, these degenerations would get worse in each generation to produce more criminals and neurotics with worse degenerations. Over time, the degenerations would progress until later generations (specifically the fourth generation) were so idiotic that they were essentially sterile and the abnormal family would die out. This theory explained why there was an increase in mental disorders and also allowed Morel to relate very different diseases as caused by previous generations because they had become more variable over time. Since there was an increase in mental disorders, Morel believed that society was approaching extinction of the imbeciles. He believed that the most degenerative illness was insanity. Morel was able to categorize degenerations into four main categories: hysteria, moral insanity, imbeciles, and idiots.

In 1857, Morel published his degeneration theory in Traité des dégénérescences physiques, intellectuelles et morales de l'espèce humaine et des causes qui produisent ces variétés maladives. In his work, he included images of twelve patients that demonstrated the physical, mental, and moral traits that were evidence of degeneration. Some of these characteristics included altered ear shape, asymmetrical faces, extra digits, and high-domed palates that had psychological representations as well. Morel's work was well received. It connected psychiatric medicine to general medicine to provide a complete and well-researched cause for a large social problem. It became dominant because it grounded moral treatment, which was questionable in this time period, in science. Morel's theory also allowed psychiatrists who were unable to help their patients explain why they had not been successful. Degeneration theory meant that there were some psychological disorders that were genetic and could not be cured by a psychiatrist. It also explained all psychological disorders. If a psychiatrist could not find a physical cause of the disease, they could blame it on the individual's constitution. It quickly spread throughout Europe with key figures spreading the information and using it to explain criminal psychology, personality disorders, and nervous disorders. Wilhem Griesinger introduced Morel's theory to Germany, Valentin Magnan helped his ideas spread in France, and Cesare Lambroso brought Morel's theory to Italy. In the 1880s, Morel's degeneration theory was very important in French psychiatry and the majority of diagnostic certificates in French mental hospitals involved the words mental degeneracy.

== Legacy ==
Morel is regarded as the father of dementia praecox and the degeneration theory. Both of these ideas helped understand mental illness as it was on the rise in 19th and 20th century France. Morel's degeneration theory gained quick popularity across Europe, which allowed it to shape further scientific developments. It was used as the basis of body typology and disposition theories as well as Lombroso's theory of anthropological criminology. His theory was highly ideological and provided a scientific rationale for the eugenics programs used by the Nazis. He is also known for generating research programs to understand the effects of paternal drinking on children. Morel's degeneration theory is a key influence on Émile Zola's Les Rougon-Macquart about the environmental influences of violence, prostitution, and other immoral activities on two branches of a family during the Industrial Revolution. In Britain, the degeneration theory bolstered the eugenics and Social Darwinism movement. Karl Pearson and Sidney Webb justified selective breeding and immigration in Britain by trying to prevent the degeneration of the British race. Not all theorists accepted Morel's work. Sigmund Freud, Karl Jaspers, Adolf Meyer, and Oswald Bumke rejected his ideas. Overall, while Morel's degeneration theory is considered outdated by modern psychiatrists, Morel is credited with creating the modern biological approach to understanding psychiatric disorders.

== Partial bibliography ==
- Traité des maladies mentales. two volumes; Paris, 1852–1853; second edition, 1860. (In the second edition he coined the term démence-precoce to refer to mental degeneration).
- Traité des Dégénérescences, 1857.
- Le no-restraint ou de l'abolition des moyens coercitifs dans le traitement de la folie. Paris, 1861.
- Du goître et du crétinisme, étiologie, prophylaxie etc. Paris, 1864.
- De la formation des types dans les variétés dégénérées. Volume 1; Rouen, 1864.

== Sources ==
- Berrios, German E.; Luque, Rogelio; Villagran, Jose M. (2003). "Schizophrenia: a conceptual history" (PDF). International Journal of Psychology and Psychological Therapy. 3: 111–140.
- Boyle, Mary (2002). Schizophrenia: A Scientific Delusion? (2nd ed.). London. ISBN 9780415227186.
- Conti, Norberto Aldo (2003). "Benedict Augustin Morel and the origin of the term dementia praecox". Vertex (Buenos Aires, Argentina). 14 (53): 227–31. PMID 14569313.
- Dowbiggin, Ian (1996). "Back to the future: Valentin Magnan, French psychiatry, and the classification of mental diseases, 1885–1925'". Social History of Medicine. 9 (3): 383–408. doi:10.1093/shm/9.3.383. PMID 11618728.
- Hoenig, J (1995). "Schizophrenia: clinical section". In Berrios, German E.; Porter, Roy (eds.). A History of Clinical Psychiatry: The Origin and History of Psychiatric Disorders. London. pp. 336–48. ISBN 978-0-485-24011-5.
- Lund, M (December 1996). "On Morel's 'épilepsie larvée: the first Danish epileptologist Frederik Hallager's opposition in 1884 against Morel's psychical epileptic equivalents". Journal of the History of the Neurosciences. 5 (3): 241–53. doi:10.1080/09647049609525673. PMID 11618744.
- Mahieu, Eduardo Luis (2004). "On Morel and dementia praecox". Vertex (Buenos Aires, Argentina). 15 (55): 73–5. PMID 15085229.
- Morel, B.A. (1852). Études cliniques: traité, théorique et pratique des maladies mentales. Vol. 1. Nancy.
- Morel, B.A. (1857). Traité des dégénérescence physiques, intellectuelles, et morales de l'espèce humaine. Paris: J.B. Balliere. ISBN 9780405074462.
- Morel, B.A. (1860). Traité des maladies mentales. Paris: V. Masson.
- Pick, Daniel (1993). Faces of degeneration : a European disorder, c. 1848-c. 1918 (1st pbk. ed.). Cambridge: Cambridge University Press. ISBN 978-0521457538.
- Stone, Michael H. (2006). "History of schizophrenia and its antecedents". In Lieberman, Jeffrey A.; Stroup, T. Scott; Perkins, Diana O. (eds.). The American Psychiatric Publishing Textbook of Schizophrenia. Arlington. pp. 1–15. ISBN 9781585626465.
