= Psychopathia Sexualis =

1886 book by Richard von Krafft-Ebing

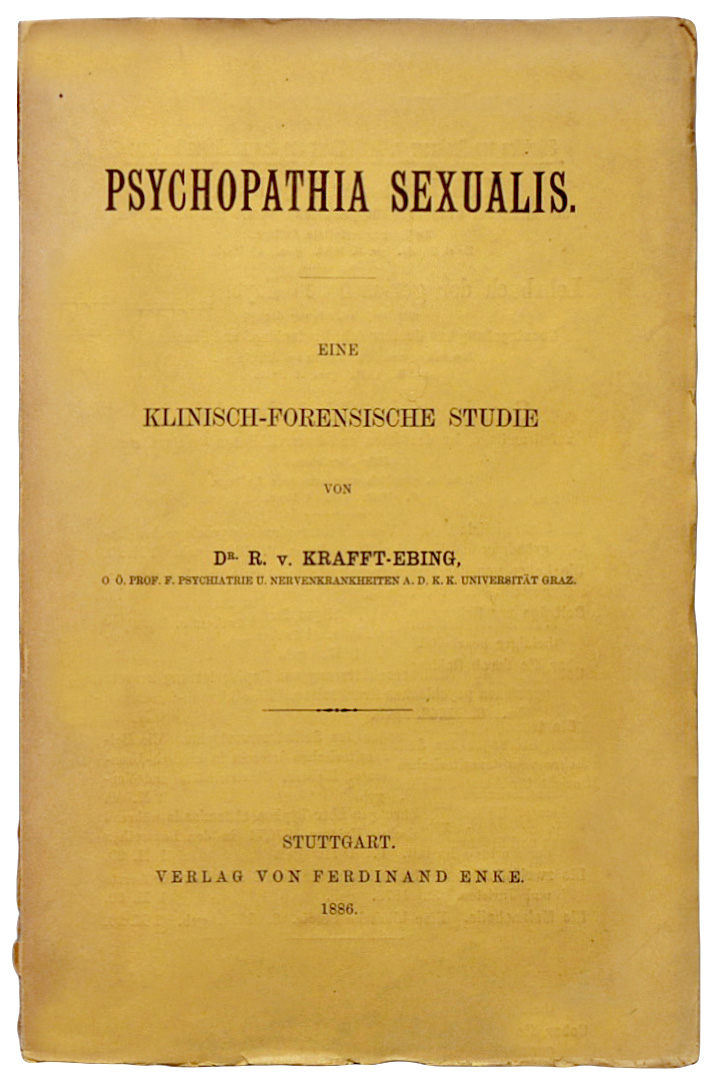
The first edition of Psychopathia Sexualis (1886)

Psychopathia Sexualis: eine klinisch-forensische Studie (Sexual Psychopathy: A Clinical-Forensic Study, also known as Psychopathia Sexualis, with Especial Reference to the Antipathetic Sexual Instinct: A Medico-forensic Study) is an 1886 book by Richard Freiherr von Krafft-Ebing and one of the first texts about sexual pathology. The book details a wide range of paraphilias and focuses on male homosexuality/bisexuality (the "antipathetic instinct" of the subtitle). The book coined the terms "sadism and masochism" as well as borrowing the term "bisexual" from botanical nomenclature.

== Background ==
Psychopathia Sexualis sought to create a taxonomy of human sexual behavior based on Richard Freiherr von Krafft-Ebing's analysis of case studies. Krafft-Ebing assumed that sex for the purpose of procreation was normal, and all other types of sexual intercourse were signs of disease, either emotional or physical.

Masochism, which Krafft-Ebing focuses on at length, is, for example, defined as a particular erotic sensibility, in which the individual is, "in his sexual feelings and thoughts, dominated by the idea of being absolutely and unconditionally subjected to a person of the other sex".

The Psychopathia Sexualis is notable for being one of the earliest works on homosexuality. Krafft-Ebing combined Karl Heinrich Ulrichs' Urning theory with Bénédict Morel's theory of social degeneration and proposed the theory that most homosexuals have a mental illness caused by degenerate heredity.

Krafft-Ebing used a spectrum of terms to describe gender variance and transgender identities. He considered homosexuality to be one form of gender variance with some transgender elements. In writing about people who were assigned one sex at birth but identified strongly as another as an adult, Krafft-Ebing defined them as having "metamorphosis sexualis paranoica", which he believed was a psychotic trait. Krafft-Ebing used the term "gynandry" for people who today might identify as trans men.

== Legacy ==
The book had a considerable influence on continental European forensic psychiatry in the first part of the 20th century. It is regarded as an important text in the history of psychopathology.

In 2006, an independent film based on the book was made in Atlanta; the film was titled Psychopathia Sexualis.

The book's discussion of androgyny and gynandry for case 131 was highlighted in the first chapter of the 2006 The Transgender Studies Reader, a major work in transgender studies edited by Susan Stryker and Stephen Whittle. The editors found it notable that some case studies presented in the book reflect specific subjective experiences that map closely to modern terms. They also valued the book as a historical example of how people discuss homosexual and transgender topics using overlapping concepts.

== Editions ==
- The first edition was published in 1886
- Charles Gilbert Chaddock published an English translation in 1892
- At least 12 editions of the book were published in German prior to Kraft-Ebing's death in 1902
- In 1965 an English translation by Franklin S. Klaf, derived from the 12th German edition, was published with an introduction by Klaf and a foreword by Daniel Blain. (In 1998, Joseph LoPiccolo's introduction was added to a new edition of the 1965 work.)
