= Charles Gilbert Chaddock =

American neurologist (1861–1936)

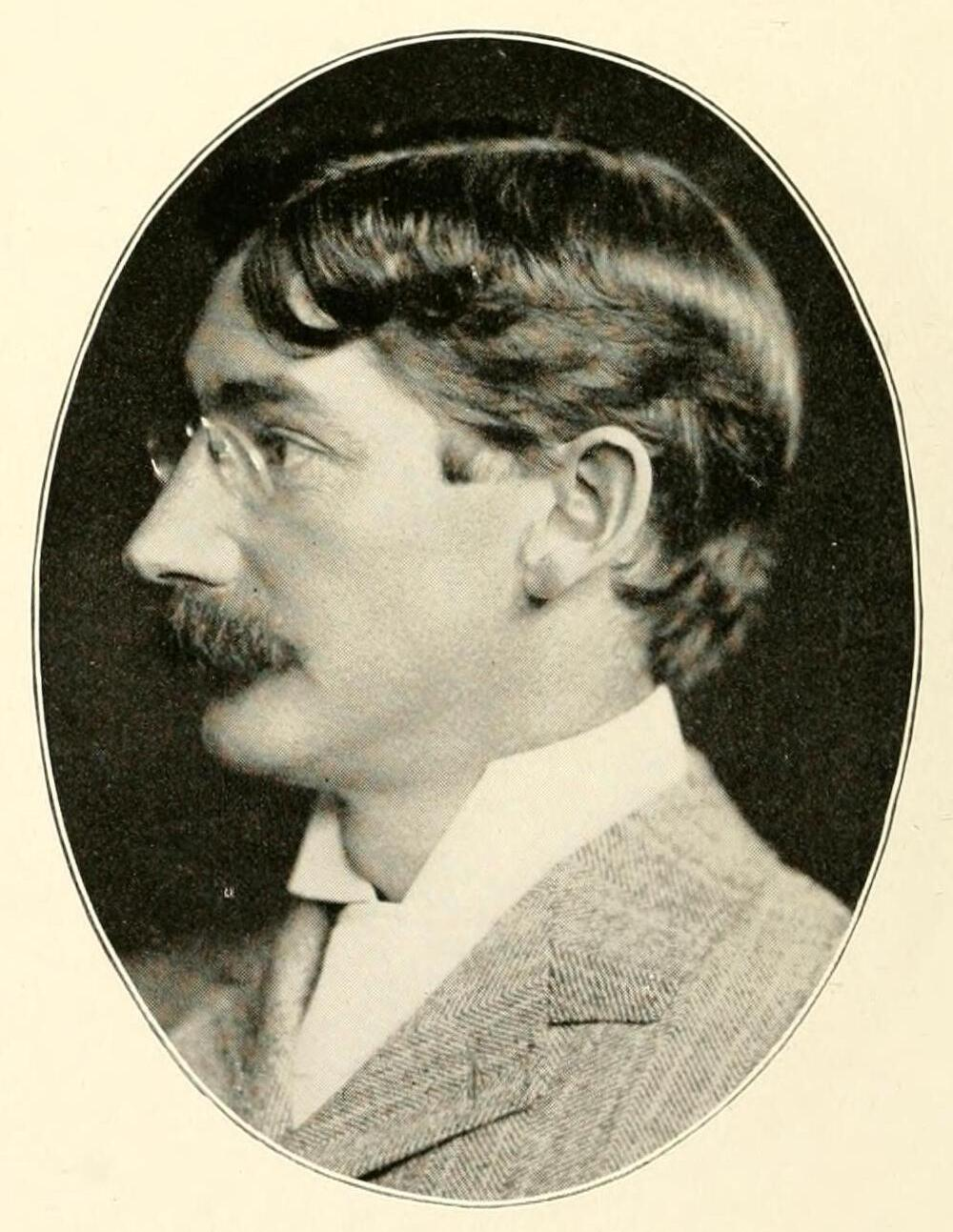
- Born: November 14, 1861; Jonesville, Michigan, U.S.
- Died: July 20, 1936 (aged 74); St. Louis, Missouri, U.S.
- Education: University of Michigan College of Medicine and Surgery
- Occupations: Neurologist, psychiatrist, translator
- Known for: Describing the Chaddock reflex and the first use of the words bisexuality, heterosexuality, and homosexuality in the English language

Charles Gilbert Chaddock (November 14, 1861 – July 20, 1936) was an American neurologist, psychiatrist, and translator. He is remembered for describing the Chaddock reflex and is credited with introducing the terms bisexuality, heterosexuality, and homosexuality from German into the English language.

== Biography ==
Charles Gilbert Chaddock was born on November 14, 1861, in Jonesville, Michigan. In 1885, he graduated from the University of Michigan College of Medicine and Surgery, then worked at the North Michigan Asylum in Traverse City as a staff physician. From 1889 to 1890, Chaddock studied in Munich. On his return, he again worked at the Asylum, before, in 1892, becoming Professor of Nervous and Mental Diseases at Marion-Sims College, which later became part of the Saint Louis University School of Medicine. He married Adelaide Gowans MacPherson in 1890. Baddock returned to Europe in 1897, spending most of the time as assistant to Joseph Babinski. On his return to the United States in 1899, Chaddock introduced American physicians to Babinski's sign, later publishing a translation of Babinski's work. Chaddock introduced his eponymous reflex in 1911, calling it the External Malleolar sign. He also described an analogous sign in the upper limb. Chaddock died on July 20, 1936. He was interred by a Protestant reverend in Oakwood Cemetery, Allegan, Michigan.

== Legacy ==
Chaddock is credited with the first use of the words heterosexuality and homosexuality in the English language, as well as the first use of the word bisexuality in its sense of being sexually attracted to both women and men, in his translation of Richard von Krafft-Ebing's Psychopathia Sexualis in 1892. Prior to Von Krafft-Ebing's new use of the term, "bisexual" was usually used to refer to hermaphroditic plants, that is having both male and female reproductive structures, or to refer to mixed-sex situations such as coed schools.
