= Richard von Krafft-Ebing =

Austrian neurologist, psychiatrist, and nobleman (1840–1902)

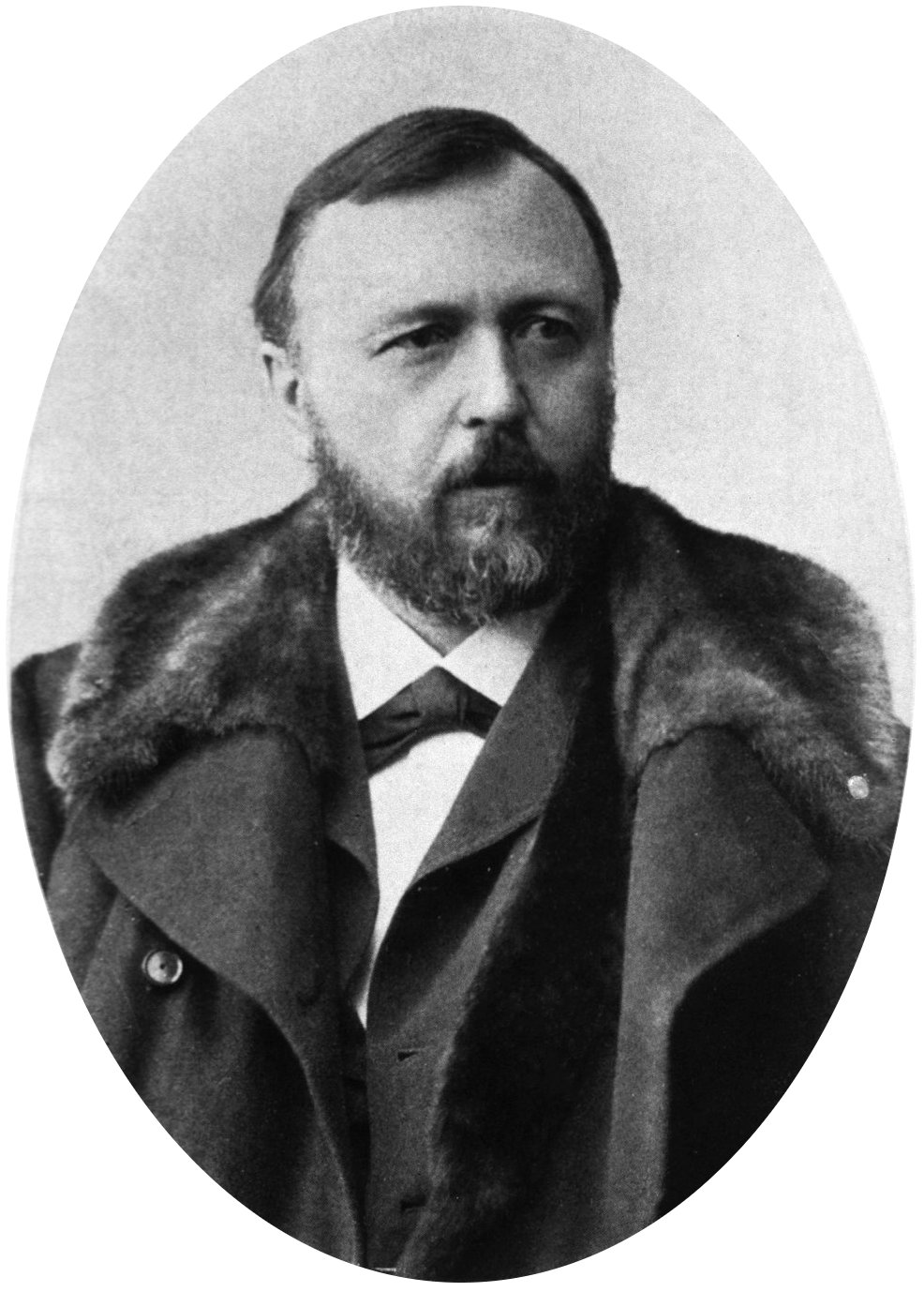
- Born: Richard Fridolin Joseph Freiherr Krafft von Festenberg auf Frohnberg, genannt von Ebing; 14 August 1840; Mannheim, Grand Duchy of Baden, German Confederation
- Died: 22 December 1902 (aged 62); Graz, Duchy of Styria, Austria-Hungary
- Education: University of Heidelberg
- Known for: Psychopathia Sexualis
- Scientific career
- Fields: Psychiatry
- Workplaces: University of Strasbourg; University of Graz; University of Vienna

Signature
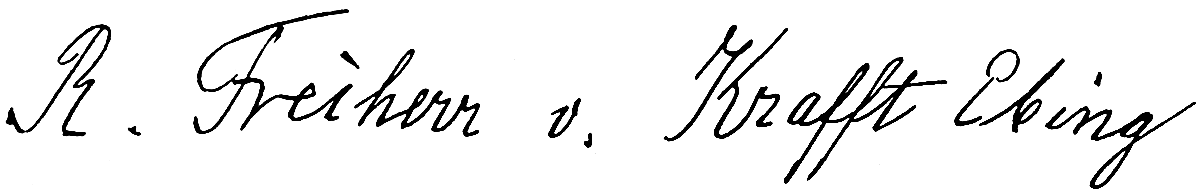

Richard Freiherr von Krafft-Ebing (full name Richard Fridolin Joseph Freiherr Krafft von Festenberg auf Frohnberg, genannt von Ebing; 14 August 1840 – 22 December 1902) was a German psychiatrist and author of the foundational work Psychopathia Sexualis (1886).

== Life and work ==
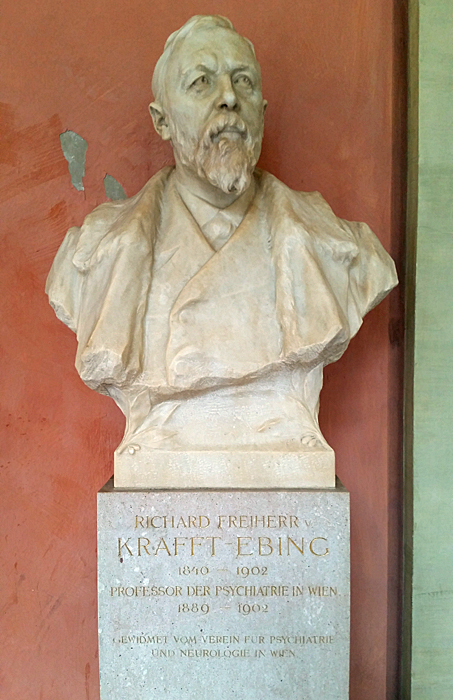
Richard von Krafft-Ebing, bust by Richard Kauffungen, courtyard of the University of Vienna

=== Background and education ===
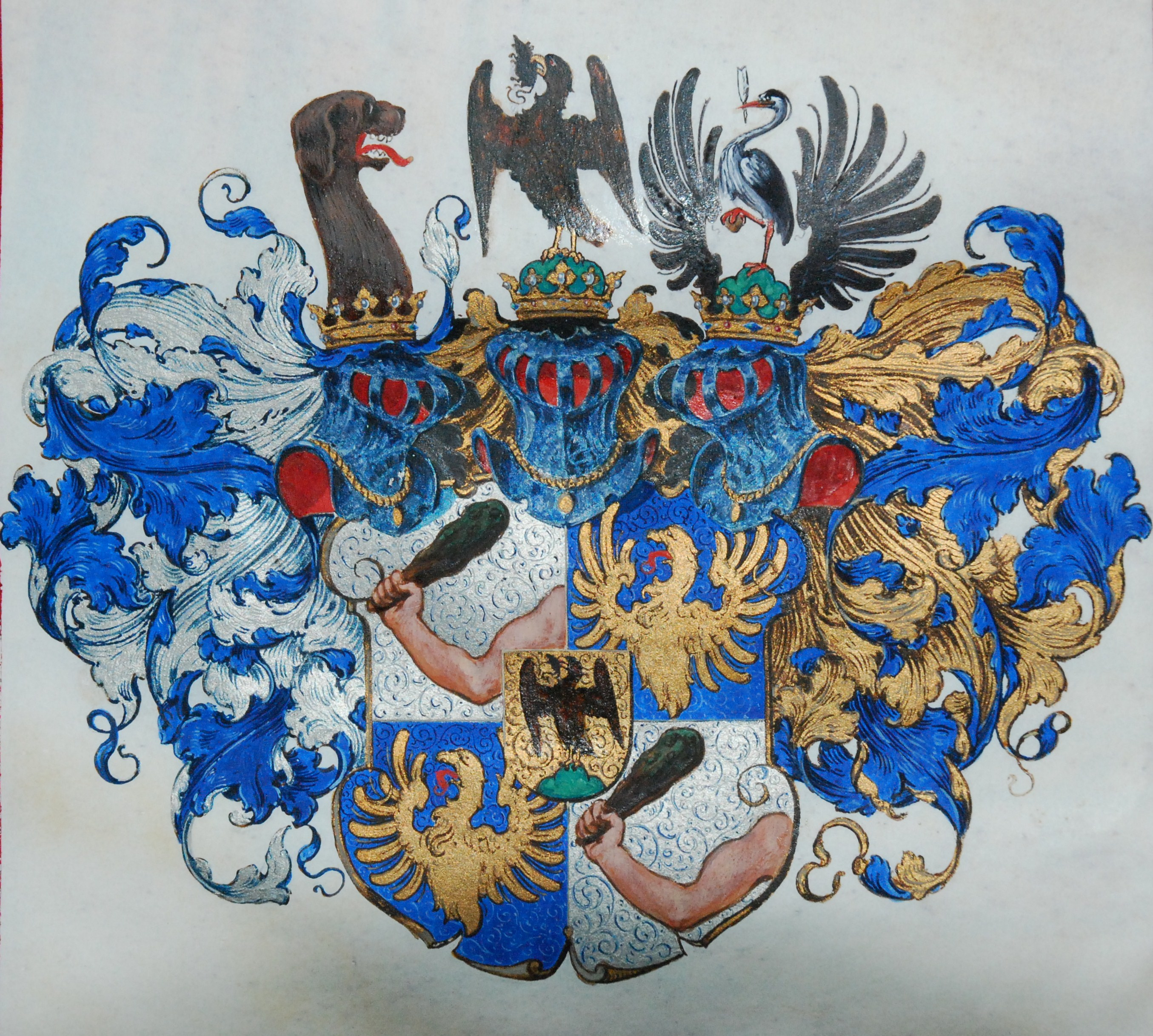
Krafft-Ebing family coat of arms

Richard von Krafft-Ebing was born as the eldest of five children to Friedrich Karl Konrad Christoph von Krafft-Ebing, a high-ranking official in the Grand Duchy of Baden.

His mother Klara Antonia Carolina was a daughter of the renowned Heidelberg legal scholar and defense attorney Carl Joseph Anton Mittermaier. His paternal lineage was ennobled in the year 1770 by Empress Maria Theresia and elevated to the Baronial status in 1805 by Emperor Franz II (as Franz I, Emperor of Austria).

Due to his father's professional relocation, the family moved initially to various locations in Baden and eventually to Heidelberg. In Heidelberg, Richard von Krafft-Ebing, after passing his university entrance exam at the University of Heidelberg, where his grandfather taught law, turned to the study of medicine. He passed the state examination in 1863 "summa cum laude" with his work on "Sensory Delusions" and earned his Doctorate in Medicine. During his studies, he became a member of Burschenschaft Frankonia Heidelberg in the winter semester of 1858/59.

=== Early medical career ===
Recovery from a bout of typhoid led him to spend a summer in Zürich, where he became acquainted with Wilhelm Griesinger's brain anatomical studies. He observed practices in Vienna, Prague, and Berlin.

In the subsequent years from 1864 to 1868, he worked as an assistant at the Baden mental hospital Illenau—chiefly under Christian Roller and Karl Hergt—gaining practical experience in the extensive field of treating and caring for the mentally ill and those suffering from neurological disorders. Since that time, he maintained a lifelong friendship with his colleague Heinrich Schüle (1840–1916), who later became the director of this institution (from 1890).

In 1868, von Krafft-Ebing set up his own practice as a neurologist in Baden-Baden, publishing Die transitorischen Störungen des Selbstbewusstseins (English: 'Transitory Disorders of Consciousness') in that year. At the beginning of his career, he looked after his younger, severely ill brother Friedrich for several months. After losing the battle for his brother's life, who was just 24, a restorative and art-focused journey, coupled with visits to psychiatric and neurological institutions, took him several weeks through southern Europe. During the Franco-Prussian War (1870/71), he first served as a field doctor with the rank of captain in the Baden Division and was then transferred as a hospital doctor to the Fortress Rastatt. His observations, especially regarding patients suffering from typhus, were compiled in a special treatise. After the end of the war, he was put in charge of the electrotherapeutic station in Baden-Baden, mainly for the neurological follow-up treatment of wounded soldiers.

=== Professor of psychiatry in Strasbourg and Graz ===
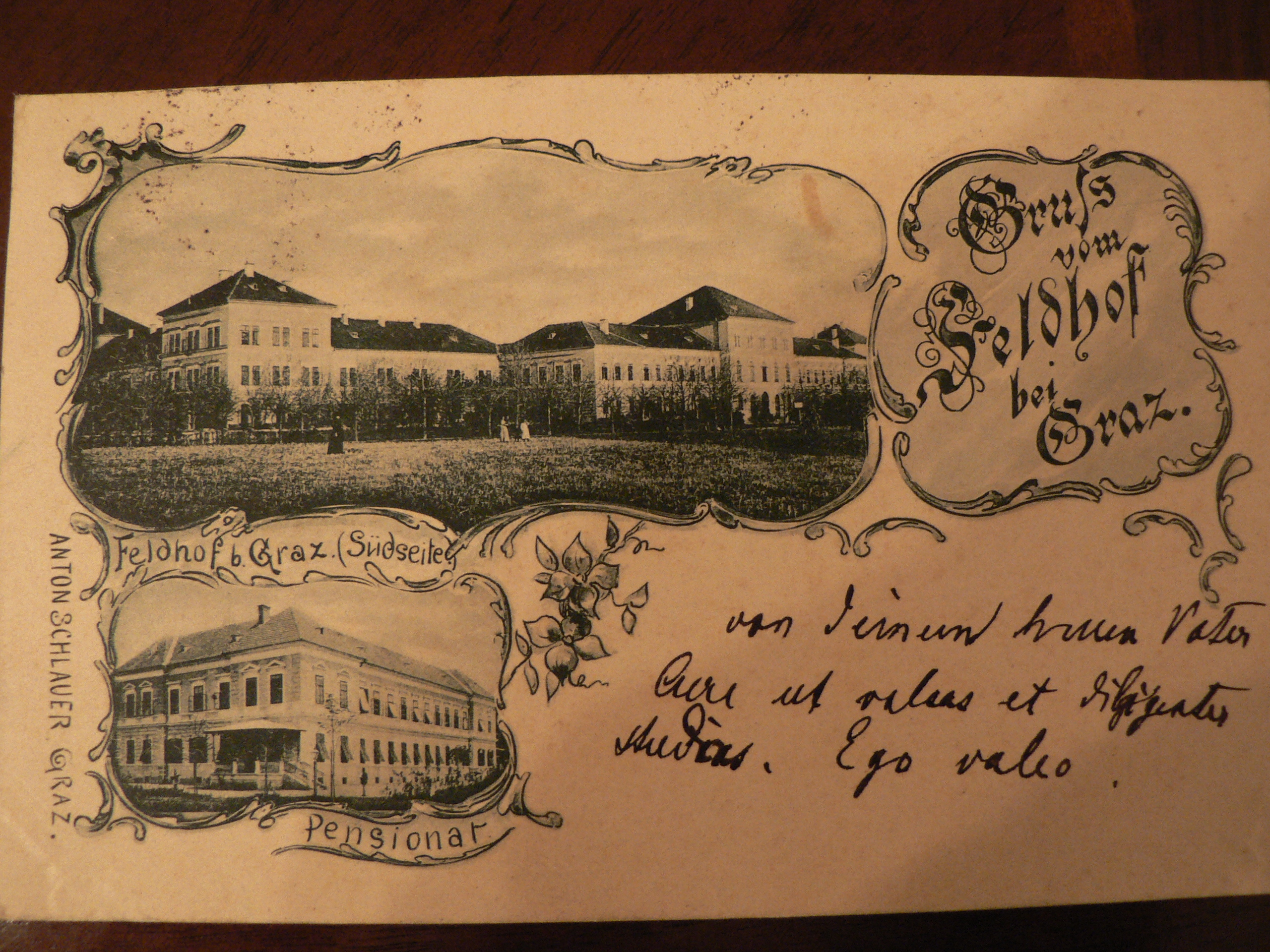
Feldhof (Postcard, dated 24 July 1898)

Already boasting an impressive number of scientific publications, von Krafft-Ebing was eager to pursue an academic career. After a trial lecture in Leipzig under the Dean of the Faculty of Medicine, Wunderlich, a decision on his habilitation was expected soon. However, on 13 May 1872, von Krafft-Ebing was able to inaugurate his psychiatric clinic in Strasbourg.

After a one-year stint at the newly established Psychiatric Clinic of the University of Strasbourg—the university clinic consisted of two beds in a room for men, another two-bed room for women, and two rooms for clinic management—the now 32-year-old university professor had to tolerate these limitations only for a short time.

Through the mediation of his teacher Roller, he was appointed in 1873 as the director of the newly established Styrian State Asylum Feldhof near Graz, and simultaneously awarded the Chair of Psychiatry at the University of Graz.

The following year, his wife Maria Luise Kißling (1846–1903), who was originally from Baden-Baden, joined him there.

On 22 May 1874, he opened the clinic in Graz and led it until 1880. After years of effort, he was finally relieved from the burdens of his dual role in such a way that he could give up the administration of the Feldhof institution. With appropriate modifications to the clinic and his appointment to a full professorship in 1885, he was solely a Professor of Psychiatry.

=== Rising fame and major works ===
A part of his research was focused on examining the relationships between psychiatry and criminal law. Already during his time in Strasbourg, he published his Fundamentals of Criminal Psychology, followed in 1875 by his first major work, Textbook of Forensic Psychopathology. Of the many publications he released, some of which saw multiple editions and became widely known, notable are his Textbook of Psychiatry (1st ed. 1879) and his most famous work Psychopathia Sexualis (1st ed. 1886), which through numerous, constantly expanded new editions, became the standard textbook on sexual pathology (see also: Sexology) of the 19th century.

Krafft-Ebing spent thirteen years in the Styrian capital. He was aware that separating psychiatry from neurology would be incompatible with fruitful effectiveness in both fields, and following constant efforts in this direction, his professorship was expanded to include both psychiatry and neurology. During his work at Feldhof and in the Graz clinic, Krafft-Ebing laid the foundation for his global fame. Within a few years, his name spread across the entire world. Patients came to him from many countries. For the increasing number of patients from wealthy families, he built a state-of-the-art Private clinic in Mariagrün for the time.

His book Psychopathia Sexualis later became a widely published standard work. In the same year, 1886, he was elected a member of the Leopoldina.

=== Activities in Vienna ===
Given the reputation that Richard von Krafft-Ebing had meanwhile established in the professional world—as he was also frequently consulted abroad (Italy, France, Russia, etc.)—it was inevitable that he was first appointed in 1889 to Vienna at the I. Psychiatric Clinic of the Lower Austrian State Asylum following Maximilian Leidesdorf, and he became a professor of psychiatry at the University of Vienna. In 1892, after the death of Theodor Meynert, he was called to the psychiatric university clinic of the Vienna General Hospital. Several professional publications appeared from his pen, including his well-known 1894 monograph Die progressive allgemeine Paralyse on progressive paralysis—a disease he also highlighted in 1897 at the International Medical Congress in Moscow in a highly regarded lecture.

According to Volkmar Sigusch, he adopted the degeneration theories of his French research colleagues and borrowed the term Sadism used in France since 1834 (Dictionnaire universel de Boiste, eighth edition) as the name for a pathology. The now well-known technical term "Masochism" was coined by him. He also dealt extensively with Hypnotism and was one of the first to apply it clinically. Increasingly, he was called in as a forensic expert.

For the subsequent generation of researchers around Magnus Hirschfeld, Krafft-Ebing's findings and his strict empirical method formed the starting point for their own research.

=== Later years in Graz ===
At the age of sixty-two, Krafft-Ebing retired for health reasons to Graz, to the private clinic in Mariagrün he had created—after having previously celebrated his thirtieth anniversary as a university professor in Vienna; and just half a year after his retirement, multiple strokes ended his life on 22 December 1902. He was buried at the St. Leonhard Cemetery in Graz and left behind his wife, two sons, and a daughter.

"He was an utterly noble nature," reads the obituary in the Wiener Klinische Wochenschrift, "toward his patients he was of touching kindness and friendliness. Nothing could disturb his calm; he possessed perfect self-control and proved himself equal to any situation. His tall figure, his firm stride, his calm gaze, his intellectual countenance had often a marvelous effect on the most agitated patients."

== Study of homosexuality ==
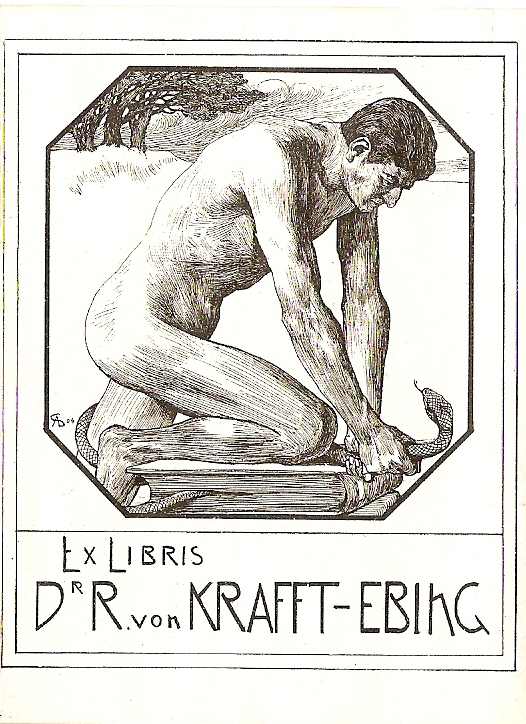
Art Nouveau exlibris for Krafft-Ebing by Alfred Schrötter von Kristelli (circa 1900)

Krafft-Ebing had particular significance for the scientific study of homosexuality. He was led to this still relatively-unexplored field of work (as per his own accounts in a letter to him) by the writings of Karl Heinrich Ulrichs and maintained a correspondence with Ulrichs over several years. Ulrichs' theory of the "Urning" (Uranian) as a third sex greatly influenced Krafft-Ebing's thinking on the subject. In the 19th century, homosexuality was widely considered by the public and especially the churches to be an expression of immoral mindset and lifestyle, a result of seduction, sexual excess or degenerate heredity (degeneration theory). It was criminalized in some countries, particularly in England, Austria and in Prussia, where it could be punished with harsh prison sentences.

Conversely, several of the constituent states in the German Confederation had reformed their criminal codes against sodomy, and homosexuality had been decriminalized in the states Hanover, Bavaria, Thuringia, Baden, and Württemberg. Krafft-Ebing was a leading psychiatrist of his day and his research initially positioned same sex attracted men and women as hereditarily burdened but not responsible for their innate "reversal" of sexual drive. Throughout his career, he supported the decriminalisation of homosexuality believing that homosexuals would be best served by medical treatment. He ran a clinic and a sanatorium offering therapeutic approaches to the modification of sexual behaviour. In time and with increased study he came to the view that there was nothing inherently pathologically wrong with the homosexual disposition.

In Psychopathia sexualis (1886), he defined homosexuality as an innate neuropsychopathic disorder—essentially a hereditary nervous disease. This diagnosis allowed him to advocate complete decriminalization of homosexuality, arguing that homosexuals were not responsible for their "malformation" and that homosexuality was not contagious. Although Krafft-Ebing was considered an authoritative figure in the field of forensic medicine at his time, this theory remained without consequences for decriminalization.

According to historian Harry Osterhuis, by the end of his career, Krafft-Ebing came to "think that homosexuality was the equivalent of heterosexuality and therefore not a psychoneuropathic degenerative illness".

== Study of transness ==
In addition to clear cases of homosexuality, there are apparently a number of individuals in the book who shunned their birth sex and show what we today know as gender incongruence or gender dysphoria — one of dozens, case 129 is notable for this, with the individual—assigned male at birth—delighting in spending as much time as they can to dress, act and do things typically associated with feminine sides of life in the 1800s, much to the chagrin of their family. A number of others akin to the previously mentioned case are also mentioned in the chapter on Androgyny & Gynandry, such as several people, assigned female at birth, who saw themselves as men, preferred masculine occupations, clothing, activities & engagements, and often lived their lives as such. Some individuals also show what we today would know as body dysphoria. In the book, Krafft-Ebing used the term "metamorphosis sexualis paranoica" to describe people who might identify as transsexual under later labels. In case 131, he describes a man who was assigned female at birth, calling this a case of "gynandry".

Krafft-Ebing equated ideas of lesbianism as an orientation and as a gender nonconformity; he cited the characters in Gustave Flaubert's Salammbô (1862) and Ernest Feydeau's La comtesse de Chalis (1867) as examples of lesbians because both novels feature female protagonists who do not adhere to social norms and express "contrary sexual feeling", although neither participated in same-sex desire or sexual behavior.

== Honors ==
In 1920, the Krafft-Ebing Street was named after him in Vienna-Penzing (14th district). Likewise, a street was named after Richard von Krafft-Ebing in the German city of Mannheim and in the Austrian city of Graz (XI. District, Graz Mariatrost).

== Works ==
A bibliography of von Krafft-Ebing's writings can be found in A. Kreuter, Deutschsprachige Neurologen und Psychiater, München 1996, Band 2, pp. 767–774.

=== Magnum opus ===
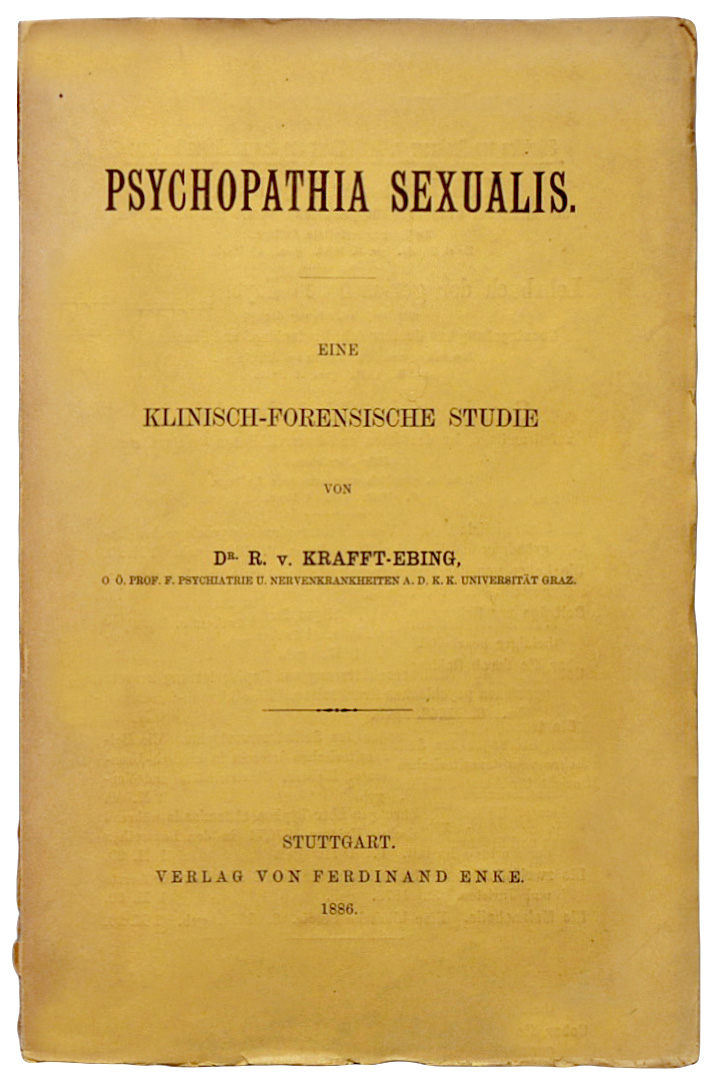
The first edition of Psychopathia Sexualis (1886), by Richard von Krafft-Ebing

Krafft-Ebing's principal work is Psychopathia Sexualis: eine Klinisch-Forensische Studie (Sexual Psychopathy: A Clinical-Forensic Study), which was first published in 1886 and expanded in subsequent editions. The last edition from the hand of the author (the twelfth) contained a total of 238 case histories of human sexual behaviour.

Translations of various editions of this book introduced to English such terms as "sadist" (derived from the brutal sexual practices depicted in the novels of the Marquis de Sade), "masochist", (derived from the name of Leopold von Sacher-Masoch), "homosexuality", "bisexuality", "necrophilia", and "anilingus".

Psychopathia Sexualis is a forensic reference book for psychiatrists, physicians, and judges. Written in an academic style, its introduction noted that, to discourage lay readers, the author had deliberately chosen a scientific term for the title of the book and that he had written parts of it in Latin for the same purpose.

Psychopathia Sexualis was one of the first books about sexual practices that studied homosexuality/bisexuality. It proposed consideration of the mental state of sex criminals in legal judgements of their crimes. During its time, it became the leading medico-legal textual authority on sexual pathology.

The twelfth and final edition of Psychopathia Sexualis presented four categories of what Krafft-Ebing called "cerebral neuroses":

- paradoxia, sexual excitement occurring independently of the period of the physiological processes in the generative organs
- anaesthesia, absence of sexual instinct
- hyperaesthesia, increased desire, satyriasis
- paraesthesia, perversion of the sexual instinct, i.e., excitability of the sexual functions to inadequate stimuli

Krafft-Ebing considered procreation the purpose of sexual desire and that any form of recreational sex was a perversion of the sex drive. "With opportunity for the natural satisfaction of the sexual instinct, every expression of it that does not correspond with the purpose of nature—i.e., propagation,—must be regarded as perverse." Hence, he concluded that homosexuals suffered a degree of sexual perversion because homosexual practices could not result in procreation. In some cases, homosexual libido was classified as a moral vice induced by the early practice of masturbation. Krafft-Ebing proposed a theory of homosexuality as biologically anomalous and originating in the embryonic and fetal stages of gestation, which evolved into a "sexual inversion" of the brain. In 1901, in an article in the Jahrbuch für sexuelle Zwischenstufen (Yearbook for Intermediate Sexual Types), he changed the biological term from anomaly to differentiation.

Although the primary focus is on sexual behaviour in men, there are sections on Sadism in Woman, Masochism in Woman, and Lesbian Love. Several of the cases of sexual activity with children were committed by women.

Krafft-Ebing's conclusions about homosexuality are now largely forgotten, partly because Sigmund Freud's theories were more interesting to physicians (who considered homosexuality to be a psychological problem) and partly because he incurred the enmity of the Austrian Catholic Church when he psychologically associated martyrdom (a desire for sanctity) with hysteria and masochism.

The term "hetero-sexual" is used, but not in chapter or section headings. The term "bi-sexuality" appears twice in the 7th edition, and more frequently in the 12th.

There is no mention of sexual activity with children in Chapter III, General Pathology, where the "cerebral neuroses" (including sexuality the paraesthesias) are covered. Various sexual acts with children are mentioned in Chapter IV, Special Pathology, but always in the context of specific mental disorders, such as dementia, epilepsy, and paranoia, never as resulting from its own disorder. However, Chapter V on sexual crimes has a section on sexual crimes with children. This section is brief in the 7th edition, but is expanded in the 12th to cover Non-Psychopathological Cases and Psychopathological Cases, in which latter subsection the term paedophilia erotica is used.

=== Other works (in German) ===
- Die Melancholie: Eine klinische Studie (1874) OCLC 180728044
- Textbook of Forensic Psychopathology (1875)
- Grundzüge der Kriminalpsychologie für Juristen (second edition, 1882) OCLC 27460358
- Psychopathia Sexualis: eine Klinisch-Forensische Studie (first edition, 1886)
- Die progressive allgemeine Paralyse (1894) OCLC 65980497
- Nervosität und neurasthenische Zustände (1895) OCLC 9633149

=== Translations ===
- Douglas Pretsell and Michael Lombardi Nash translated the autobiographic case studies in Queer Voices in the Works of Richard von Krafft Ebing, 1883-1901 (2023) ISBN 978-3-031-17330-1 https://doi.org/10.1007/978-3-031-17331-8
- Domino Falls translated and edited Psychopathia Sexualis:The Case Histories (1997) ISBN 978-0-9820464-7-0
- Charles Gilbert Chaddock translated four of Krafft-Ebing's books into English:
  - An Experimental Study in the Domain of Hypnotism (New York and London, 1889)
  - Psychosis Menstrualis (1902)
  - Psychopathia Sexualis (twelfth edition, 1903)
  - Text-Book of Insanity (1905)

== Gallery ==
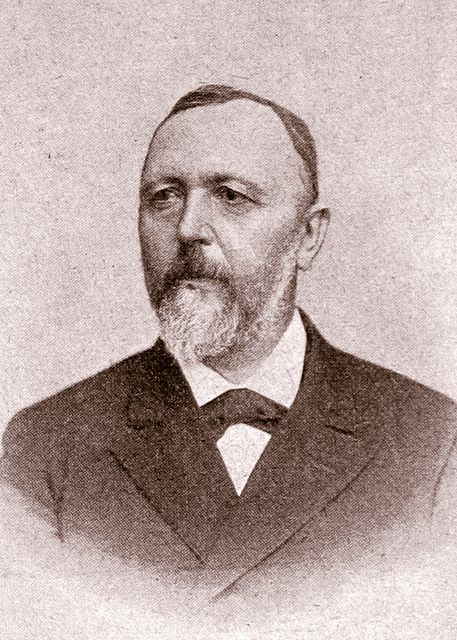
Richard von Krafft-Ebing

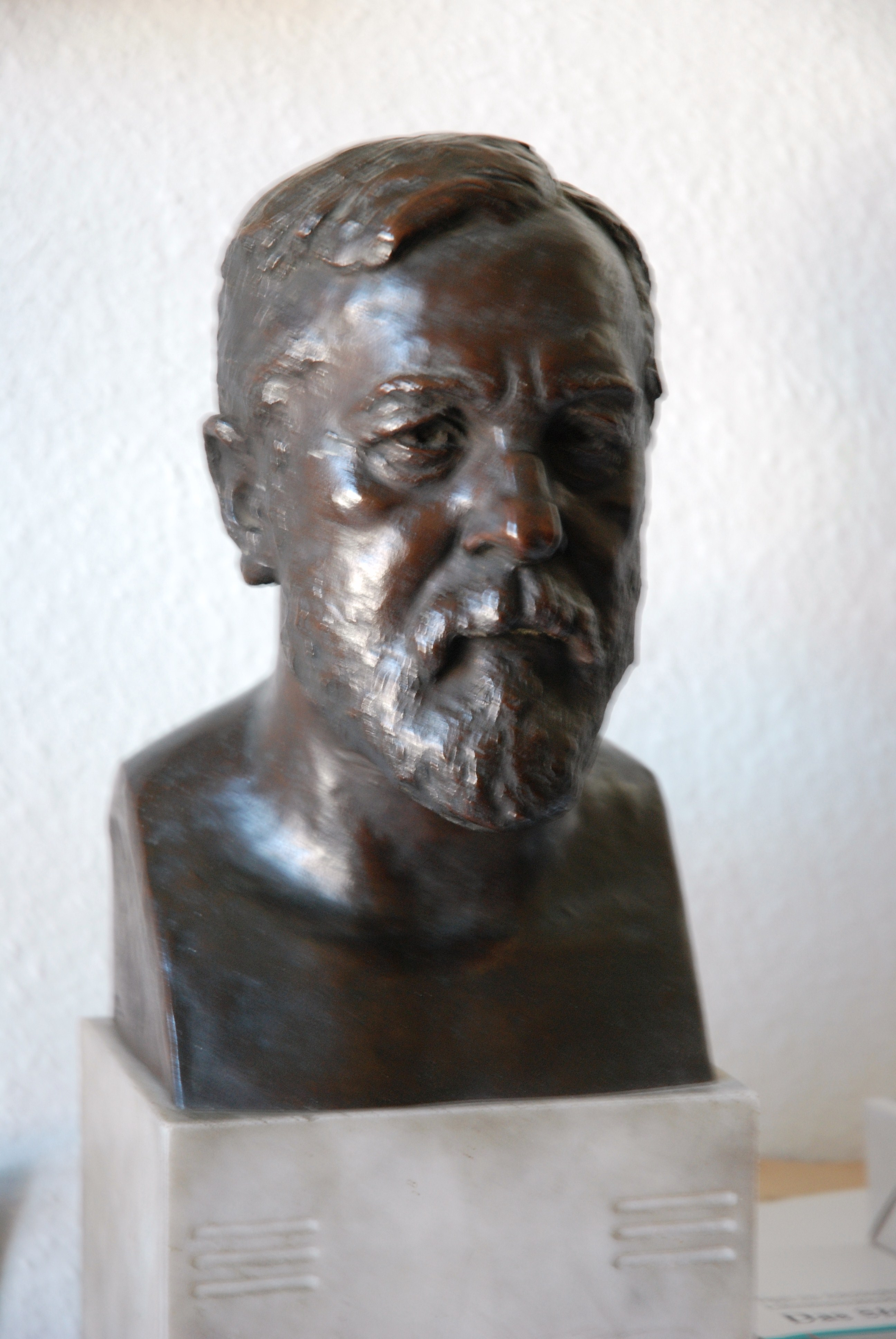
Richard von Krafft-Ebing (Bronze bust by Theodor Charlemont, 1904)

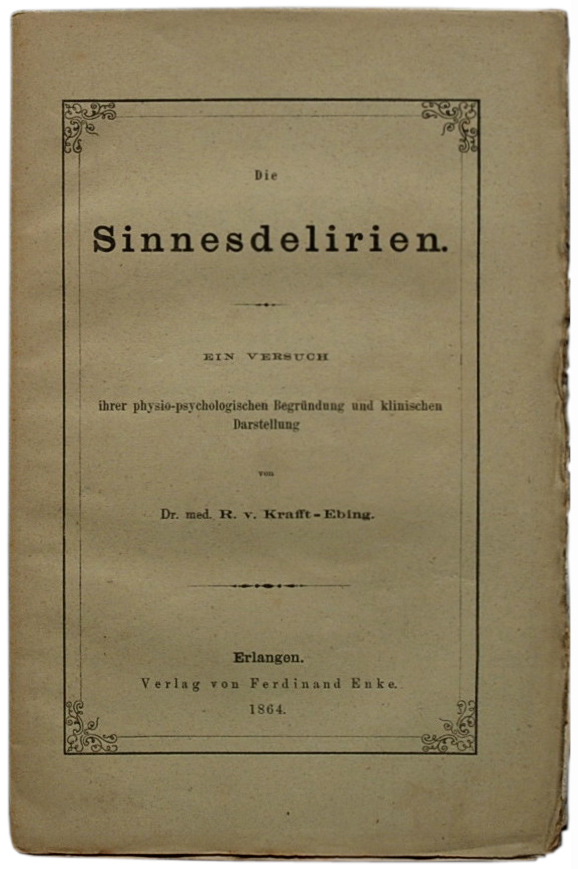
The Sensory Delusions, 1864

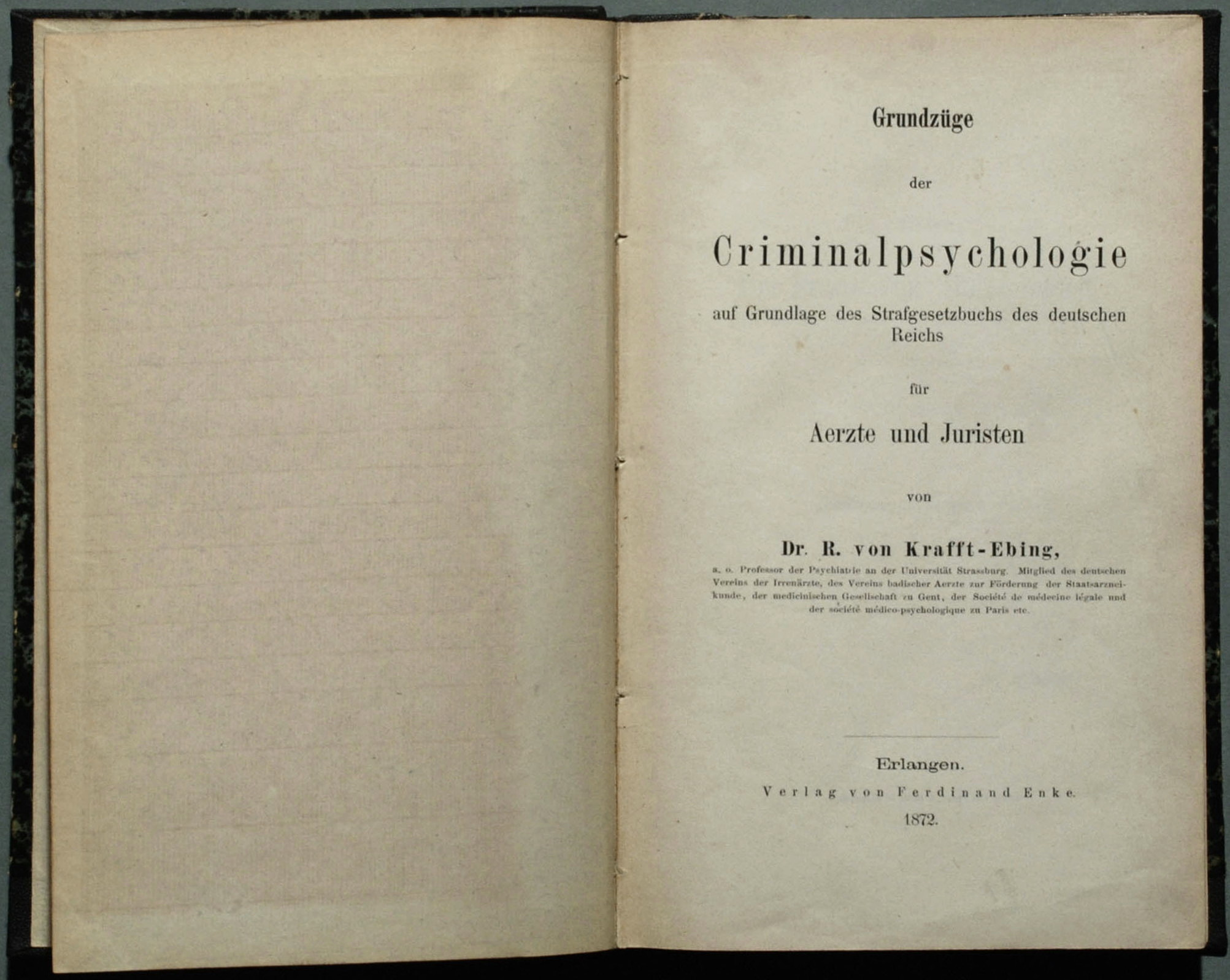
Fundamentals of Criminal Psychology, 1872

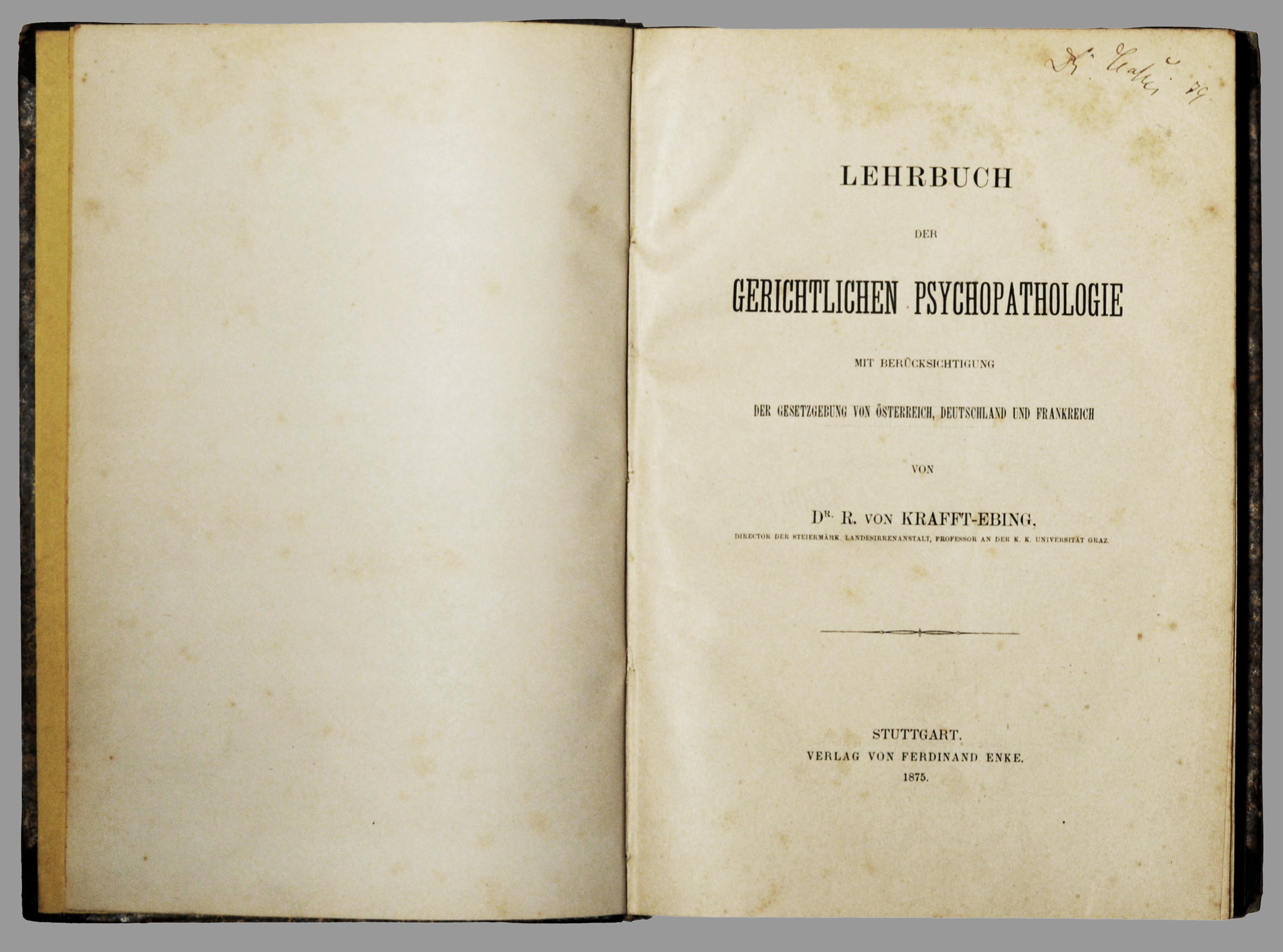
Textbook of Forensic Psychopathology, 1875

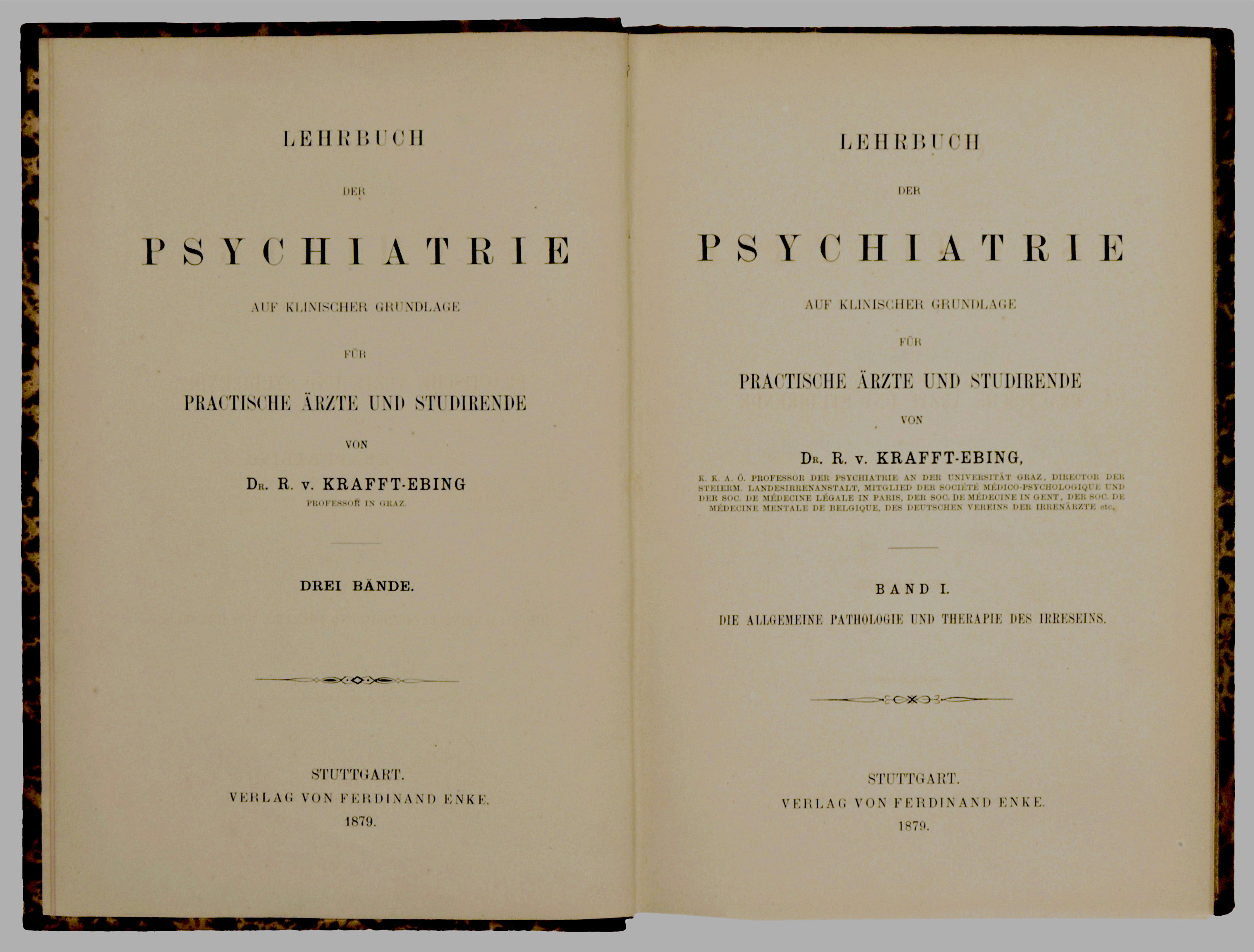
Textbook of Psychiatry, 1879

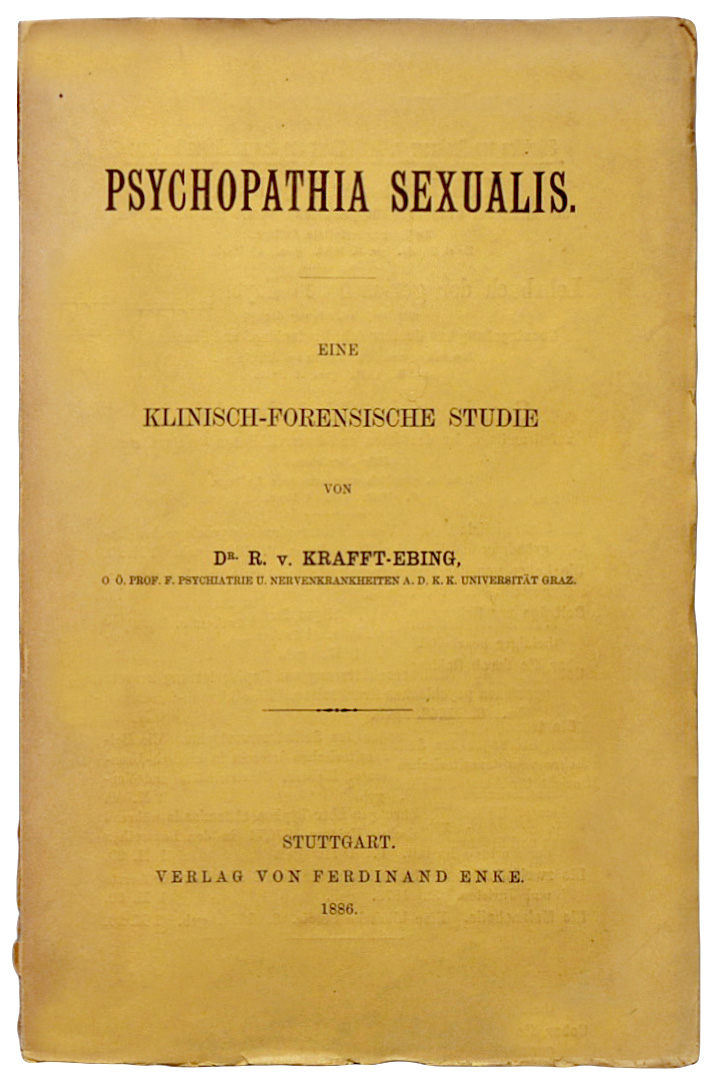
Psychopathia sexualis, 1886

== See also ==
- Paraphilia
- Sexual fetishism
- Sexology

== Sources ==
- Johnson, J (1973), "Psychopathia Sexualis.", The Manchester Medical Gazette, vol. 53, no. 2 (published December 1973), pp. 32–4, PMID 4596802
- Pretsell, D (2023), Queer Voices in the works of Richard von Krafft Ebing, 1883-1901 ISBN 978-3-031-17330-1 https://doi.org/10.1007/978-3-031-17331-8
- Kupferschmidt, H (1987), "Richard von Krafft-Ebing's "Psychopathia sexualis". Pornography or professional literature?", Schweiz. Rundsch. Med. Prax., vol. 76, no. 20 (published 12 May 1987), pp. 563–9, PMID 3306869
- "Richard Freiherr von Krafft-Ebing (1840–1903); comments on the cover portrait", Der Nervenarzt, vol. 72, no. 9 (published September 2001), p. 742, 2001, doi:10.1007/s001150170056, PMID 11599501, S2CID 40857058
- Rosario, Vernon A (2002), "Science and sexual identity: an essay review.", Journal of the History of Medicine and Allied Sciences, vol. 57, no. 1 (published January 2002), pp. 79–85, doi:10.1093/jhmas/57.1.79, PMID 11892515, S2CID 29913060
- Hertoft, Preben (2002), "Psychotherapeutic treatment of sexual dysfunction—or from sex therapy to marital therapy", Ugeskrift for Læger, vol. 164, no. 41 (published 7 October 2002), pp. 4805–8, PMID 12407889
- Kennedy, H (2001), "Research and commentaries on Richard von Krafft-Ebing and Karl Heinrich Ulrichs.", Journal of Homosexuality, vol. 42, no. 1, pp. 165–78, doi:10.1300/J082v42n01_09, PMID 11991564, S2CID 42582792
- Sigusch, V (2004), "Richard von Krafft-Ebing (1840–1902. In memory of the 100th anniversary of his death", Der Nervenarzt, vol. 75, no. 1 (published January 2004), pp. 92–6, doi:10.1007/s00115-003-1512-7, PMID 14722666, S2CID 22595330

== Bibliography ==
- Heinrich Ammerer. "Am Anfang war die Perversion." Richard von Krafft-Ebing, Psychiater und Pionier der modernen Sexualkunde. Vienna: Verlagsgruppe Styria, 2011. ISBN 978-3-222-13321-3.
- Psychopathia Sexualis (1886). Reprint, Burbank, CA: Bloat, 1999. ISBN 0-9650324-1-8
- Harry Oosterhuis. Stepchildren of Nature: Krafft-Ebing, Psychiatry, and the Making of Sexual Identity. Chicago: University of Chicago Press, 2000. ISBN 0-226-63059-5
- Gordene Olga Mackenzie. Transgender Nation. Madison: University of Wisconsin Press, 1994. ISBN 0-87972-596-6
- Jörg Hutter. "Richard von Krafft-Ebing", in Homosexualität. Handbuch der Theorie- und Forschungsgeschichte, pp. 48–54. Ed. Rüdiger Lautmann. Frankfurt am Main: Campus, 1993. ISBN 3-593-34747-4
- John K. Noyes. The Mastery of Submission. Inventions of Masochism. Ithaca: Cornell University Press, 1997. ISBN 0-8014-3345-2
- Rainer Krafft-Ebing, ed. Richard Freiherr von Krafft-Ebing. Eine Studienreise durch Südeuropa 1869/70. Graz: Leykam Buchverlag, 2000. ISBN 3-7011-7426-1
- Peter Weibel, ed. Phantom of Desire, Visions of Masochism. Essays and Texts, pp. 36–38. Graz: Neue Galerie am Landesmuseum Joanneum. ISBN 3-936298-24-6
- Paolo Savoia. "Sexual Science and Self-Narrative: Epistemology and Narrative Technologies of the Self between Krafft-Ebing and Freud," History of the Human Sciences, 23 (5), 2010.
- Heinrich Ammerer: Krafft-Ebing, Freud und die Erfindung der Perversion. (Versuch einer Einkreisung). Tectum, Marburg 2006, ISBN 3-8288-9159-4.
- Wolfgang U. Eckart: Medizin und Krieg. Deutschland 1914–1924, Ferdinand Schöningh Verlag Paderborn 2014, hier Abschnitt 2.1: So lange Frieden: Medizin in der nervösen Zivilgesellschaft vor 1914, S. 21–32, zu Krafft-Ebing S. 25–28, ISBN 978-3-506-75677-0.
- Hoff-Unterrainer: "Krafft-Ebing Richard Frh. von". In: Österreichisches Biographisches Lexikon 1815–1950 (ÖBL). Vol. 4, Austrian Academy of Sciences, Vienna 1969, p. 190 f. (Direct links to "p. 190", "p. 191")
- Jörg Hutter: Richard von Krafft-Ebing. In: Rüdiger Lautmann (Hrsg.): Homosexualität. Handbuch der Theorie- und Forschungsgeschichte. Campus, Frankfurt am Main u. a. 1993, ISBN 3-593-34747-4, S. 48–54.
- Hildburg Kindt (1980). "Krafft-Ebing, Richard Freiherr von". Neue Deutsche Biographie (in German). Vol. 12. Berlin: Duncker & Humblot. pp. 649–650. (full text online).
- Harry Oosterhuis: Stepchildren of nature. Krafft-Ebing, Psychiatry, and the making of sexual Identity. University of Chicago Press, Chicago 2000, ISBN 0-226-63059-5.
- Volkmar Sigusch: Richard von Krafft-Ebing. Bericht über den Nachlass und Genogramm. In: Zeitschrift für Sexualforschung. 15, 2002, ISSN 0932-8114, S. 341–354.
- Volkmar Sigusch: Richard von Krafft-Ebing (1840–1902). Eine Erinnerung zur 100. Wiederkehr des Todestages. In: Der Nervenarzt. 75, 2004, ISSN 0028-2804, S. 92–96.
- Volkmar Sigusch: Geschichte der Sexualwissenschaft. Campus, Frankfurt am Main u. a. 2008, ISBN 978-3-593-38575-4, S. 175–193.
- Volkmar Sigusch: Richard von Krafft-Ebing (1840–1902). In: Volkmar Sigusch, Günter Grau (Hrsg.): Personenlexikon der Sexualforschung. Campus, Frankfurt am Main u. a. 2009, ISBN 978-3-593-39049-9, S. 375–382.
- Norbert Weiss: Das Grazer Universitäts-Klinikum: Eine Jubiläumsgeschichte in hundert Bildern. KAGesVerlag, Graz 2013, ISBN 978-3-9502281-5-1, S. 55.
- Hans Georg Zapotoczky, P. Hofmann: Werk und Person von Krafft-Ebing aus der Sicht unserer Zeit. In: Gerhardt Nissen, Frank Badura (Hrsg.): Schriftenreihe der Deutschen Gesellschaft für Geschichte der Naturwissenschaften. Band 3. Würzburg 1997, S. 213–225.
