= Diana Perkins =

American professor of psychiatry

Academic background
- Education: University of Maryland (BS); University of Maryland School of Medicine (MD); University of North Carolina at Chapel Hill (MPH)

Academic work
- Discipline: Psychiatrist
- Sub-discipline: Psychosis; Schizophrenia
- Institutions: University of North Carolina at Chapel Hill

Diana O. Perkins is an American professor at the University of North Carolina's (UNC) School of Medicine where she teaches psychiatry; she is a fellow with outreach roles. Her research involves early diagnosis and treatment of schizophrenia. She is noted for publishing a study that demonstrated that using a polygenic risk score (PRS) based on data from genome-wide association studies improved the psychosis risk prediction in persons meeting clinical high-risk criteria.

== Education ==
Perkins' undergraduate work was completed at the University of Maryland in Psychology and Biochemistry; she received her Doctor of Medicine at University of Maryland School of Medicine. She completed a graduate degree in Epidemiology from UNC.
