= Richard Samuel Chattock =

English painter (1825–1906)

- Born: 23 August 1825; Solihull, England
- Died: 30 January 1906 (aged 80); Clifton, Bristol, England

The Gin by Richard Samuel Chattock

Richard Samuel Chattock JP RBSA (23 August 1825 – 30 January 1906) was an English printmaker, painter and etcher.

== Biography ==
Chattock was born in Solihull (then in Warwickshire), the third son of Thomas Chattock, a solicitor. After studying at Rugby School, he too entered the legal profession. However, in the late 1850s he began following his interest in art, exhibiting his work in the Royal Birmingham Society of Artists. From 1869 to 1891, he exhibited in the Royal Academy of Arts.

Chattock often painted rural scenes and architectural subjects. In 1872, he completed his most famous works, sixteen etchings that depict the industrial landscape of the Black Country considered an unusual choice for artists. For each etching, Chattock gave a description of what is being portrayed, and often how the objects in the etchings were used in the industry. While these descriptions tell of the "intense desolation" of the Black Country, due to an industry that "ransacked [its] depths", Chattock is often focused on what he calls "single picturesqueness, if not beauty."

In 1876 and 1881, he became a member of the RBSA and Royal Society of Painter-Printmakers respectively. He published a manual for other artists entitled Practical Notes on Etchings in 1883.

He died at St Vincent's Hall, Clifton, Bristol, age 81.
