= Chaddock reflex =

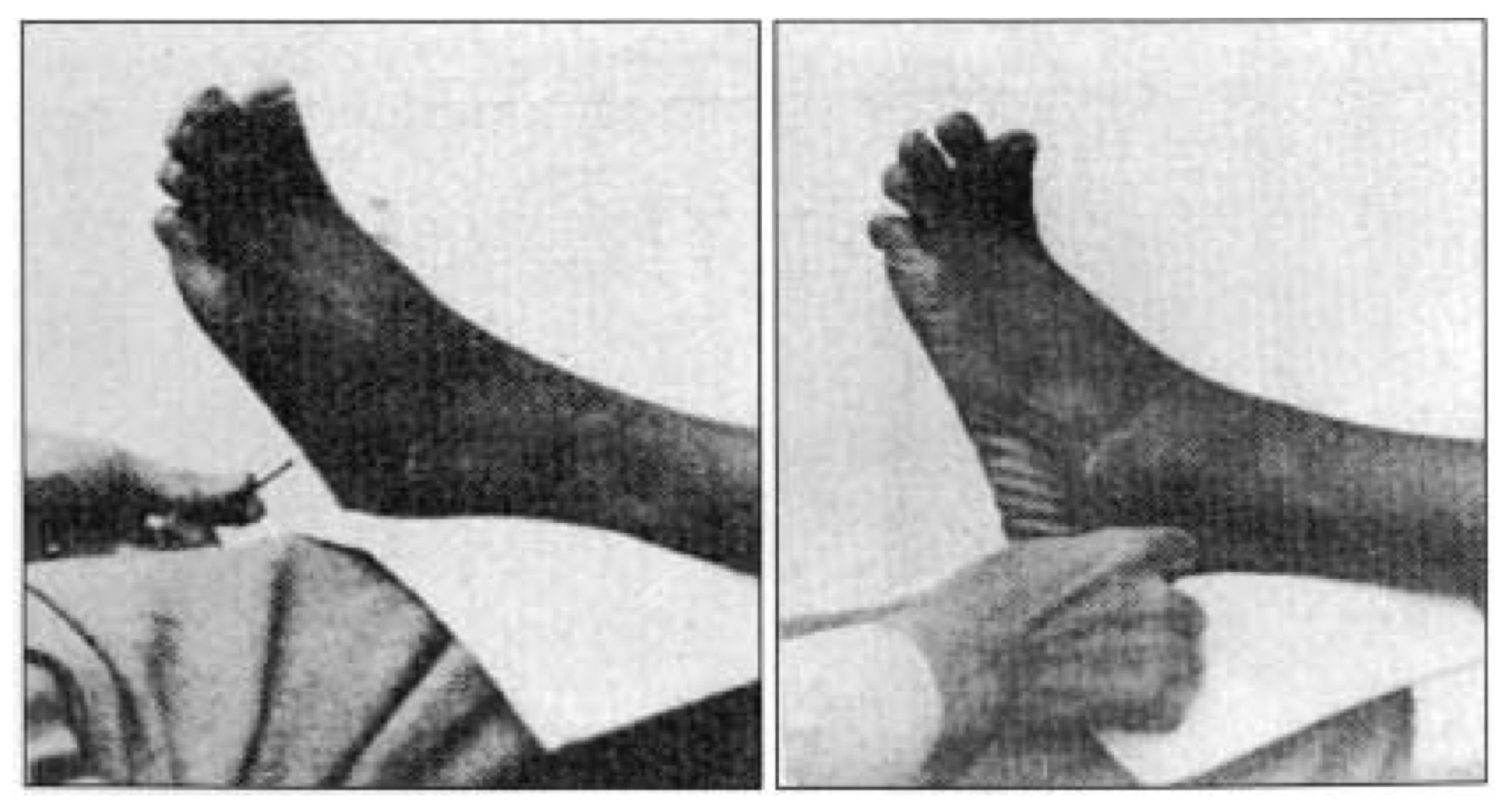
- Demonstration of the Chaddock reflex in an early publication by Charles G. Chaddock
- Differential diagnosis: corticospinal tract damage

The Chaddock reflex is a diagnostic reflex similar to the Babinski reflex. Chaddock's sign is present when stroking of the lateral malleolus causes extension of the great toe, indicating damage to the corticospinal tract.

It was identified by Charles Gilbert Chaddock in 1911.
