= Saint-Yon =

Commune in Île-de-France, France

- Commune
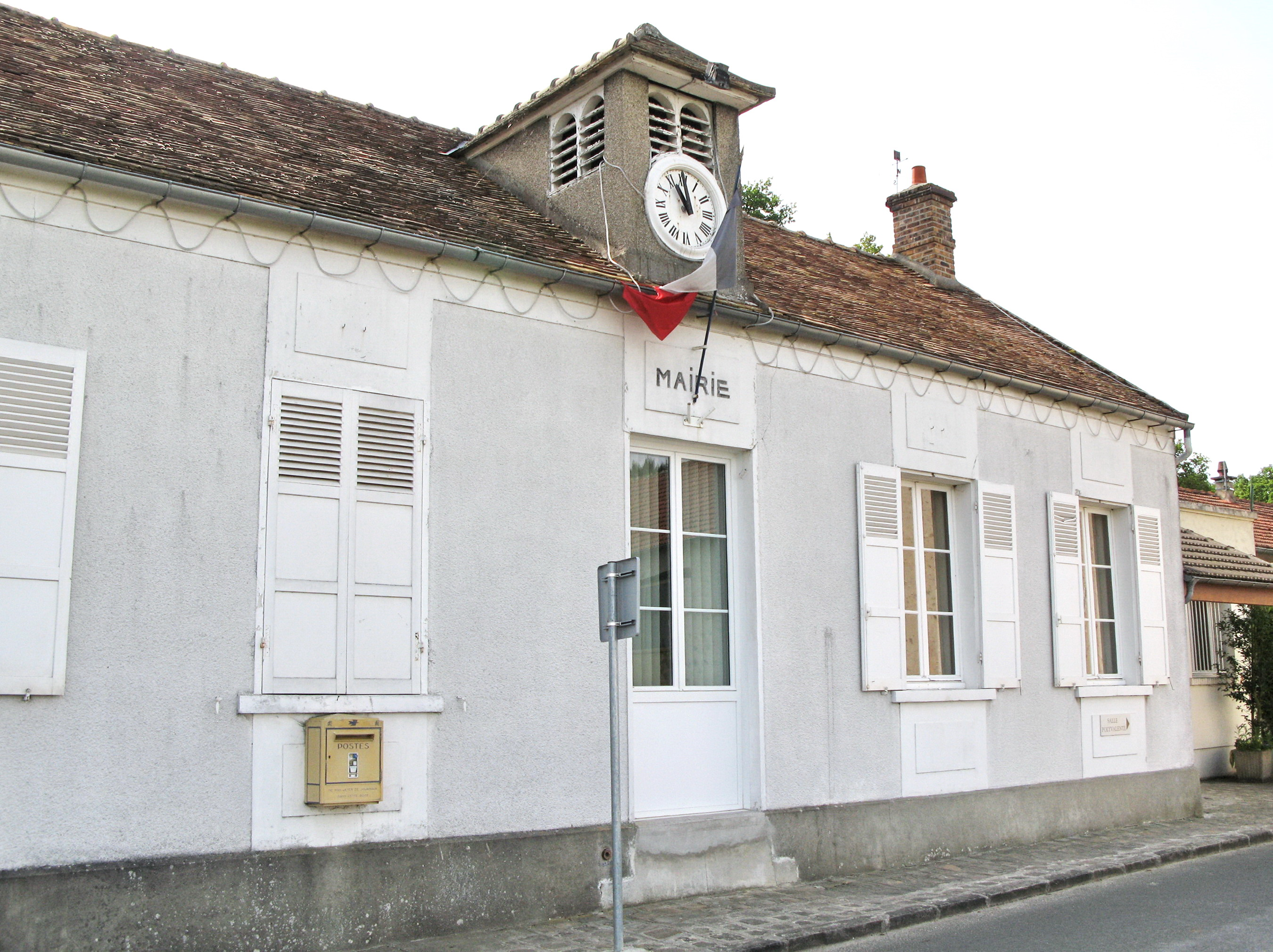
- The town hall in Saint-Yon

- Coat of arms
- Location of Saint-Yon
- Location within France Location within Île-de-France (region)
- Coordinates: 48°33′38″N 2°11′02″E
- Country: France
- Region: Île-de-France
- Department: Essonne
- Arrondissement: Étampes
- Canton: Arpajon

Government
  - Mayor (2020–2026): Alexandre Touzet
- Area^{1}: 4.66 km^{2} (1.80 sq mi)
- Highest elevation: 154 m (505 ft)
- Lowest elevation: 52 m (171 ft)
- Population (2023): 923
  - Density: 198/km^{2} (513/sq mi)
- Time zone: UTC+01:00 (CET)
  - Summer (DST): UTC+02:00 (CEST)
- INSEE/Postal code: 91581 /91650
- ^{1} French Land Register data, which excludes lakes, ponds, glaciers > 1 km^{2} (0.386 sq mi or 247 acres) and river estuaries.

Saint-Yon (French pronunciation: [sɛ̃.t‿jɔ̃]) is a commune in the Essonne department in Île-de-France in northern France.

Inhabitants of Saint-Yon are known as Saint-Yonais.

== See also ==
- Communes of the Essonne department
