= List of mental disorders in the DSM-II =

This is a list of mental disorders as defined in the DSM-II, the second edition of the Diagnostic and Statistical Manual of Mental Disorders, and their corresponding ICD-8 diagnostic codes. Published by the American Psychiatric Association, it was released in 1968, superseding the DSM-I.

== Mental retardation ==
- 310 Borderline mental retardation
  - 310.0 Borderline mental retardation following infection or intoxication
  - 310.1 Borderline mental retardation following trauma or physical agent
  - 310.2 Borderline mental retardation with disorders of metabolism, growth, or nutrition
  - 310.3 Borderline mental retardation associated with gross brain disease (postnatal)
  - 310.4 Borderline mental retardation associated with diseases and conditions due to (unknown) prenatal influence
  - 310.5 Borderline mental retardation with chromosomal abnormality
  - 310.6 Borderline mental retardation associated with prematurity
  - 310.7 Borderline mental retardation following major psychiatric disorder
  - 310.8 Borderline mental retardation with psycho-social (environmental) deprivation
  - 310.9 Borderline mental retardation with other [and unspecified] condition
- 311 Mild mental retardation
  - 311.0 Mild mental retardation following infection or intoxication
  - 311.1 Mild mental retardation following trauma or physical agent
  - 311.2 Mild mental retardation with disorders of metabolism, growth, or nutrition
  - 311.3 Mild mental retardation associated with gross brain disease (postnatal)
  - 311.4 Mild mental retardation associated with diseases and conditions due to (unknown) prenatal influence
  - 311.5 Mild mental retardation with chromosomal abnormality
  - 311.6 Mild mental retardation associated with prematurity
  - 311.7 Mild mental retardation following major psychiatric disorder
  - 311.8 Mild mental retardation with psycho-social (environmental) deprivation
  - 311.9 Mild mental retardation with other [and unspecified] condition
- 312 Moderate mental retardation
  - 312.0 Moderate mental retardation following infection or intoxication
  - 312.1 Moderate mental retardation following trauma or physical agent
  - 312.2 Moderate mental retardation with disorders of metabolism, growth, or nutrition
  - 312.3 Moderate mental retardation associated with gross brain disease (postnatal)
  - 312.4 Moderate mental retardation associated with diseases and conditions due to (unknown) prenatal influence
  - 312.5 Moderate mental retardation with chromosomal abnormality
  - 312.6 Moderate mental retardation associated with prematurity
  - 312.7 Moderate mental retardation following major psychiatric disorder
  - 312.8 Moderate mental retardation with psycho-social (environmental) deprivation
  - 312.9 Moderate mental retardation with other [and unspecified] condition
- 313 Severe mental retardation
  - 313.0 Severe mental retardation following infection or intoxication
  - 313.1 Severe mental retardation following trauma or physical agent
  - 313.2 Severe mental retardation with disorders of metabolism, growth, or nutrition
  - 313.3 Severe mental retardation associated with gross brain disease (postnatal)
  - 313.4 Severe mental retardation associated with diseases and conditions due to (unknown) prenatal influence
  - 313.5 Severe mental retardation with chromosomal abnormality
  - 313.6 Severe mental retardation associated with prematurity
  - 313.7 Severe mental retardation following major psychiatric disorder
  - 313.8 Severe mental retardation with psycho-social (environmental) deprivation
  - 313.9 Severe mental retardation with other [and unspecified] condition
- 314 Profound mental retardation
  - 314.0 Profound mental retardation following infection or intoxication
  - 314.1 Profound mental retardation following trauma or physical agent
  - 314.2 Profound mental retardation with disorders of metabolism, growth, or nutrition
  - 314.3 Profound mental retardation associated with gross brain disease (postnatal)
  - 314.4 Profound mental retardation associated with diseases and conditions due to (unknown) prenatal influence
  - 314.5 Profound mental retardation with chromosomal abnormality
  - 314.6 Profound mental retardation associated with prematurity
  - 314.7 Profound mental retardation following major psychiatric disorder
  - 314.8 Profound mental retardation with psycho-social (environmental) deprivation
  - 314.9 Profound mental retardation with other [and unspecified] condition
- 315 Unspecified mental retardation
  - 315.0 Unspecified mental retardation following infection or intoxication
  - 315.1 Unspecified mental retardation following trauma or physical agent
  - 315.2 Unspecified mental retardation with disorders of metabolism, growth, or nutrition
  - 315.3 Unspecified mental retardation associated with gross brain disease (postnatal)
  - 315.4 Unspecified mental retardation associated with diseases and conditions due to (unknown) prenatal influence
  - 315.5 Unspecified mental retardation with chromosomal abnormality
  - 315.6 Unspecified mental retardation associated with prematurity
  - 315.7 Unspecified mental retardation following major psychiatric disorder
  - 315.8 Unspecified mental retardation with psycho-social (environmental) deprivation
  - 315.9 Unspecified mental retardation with other [and unspecified] condition

== Organic brain syndromes ==
=== Psychoses associated with organic brain syndromes ===
- 290 Senile and pre-senile dementia
  - 290.0 Senile dementia
  - 290.1 Pre-senile dementia
- 291 Alcoholic psychosis
  - 291.0 Delirium tremens
  - 291.1 Korsakov's psychosis (alcoholic)
  - 291.2 Other alcoholic hallucinosis
  - 291.3 Alcohol paranoid state (alcoholic paranoia)
  - 291.4 Acute alcohol intoxication
  - 291.5 Alcoholic deterioration
  - 291.6 Pathological intoxication
  - 291.9 Other [and unspecified] alcoholic psychosis
- 292 Psychosis associated with intracranial infection
  - 292.0 Psychosis with general paralysis
  - 292.1 Psychosis with other syphilis of central nervous system
  - 292.2 Psychosis with epidemic encephalitis
  - 292.3 Psychosis with other and unspecified encephalitis
  - 292.9 Psychosis with other [and unspecified] intracranial infection
- 293 Psychosis associated with other cerebral condition
  - 293.0 Psychosis with cerebral arteriosclerosis
  - 293.1 Psychosis with other cerebrovascular disturbance
  - 293.2 Psychosis with epilepsy
  - 293.3 Psychosis with intracranial neoplasm
  - 293.4 Psychosis with degenerative disease of the central nervous system
  - 293.5 Psychosis with brain trauma
  - 293.9 Psychosis with other [and unspecified] cerebral condition
- 294 Psychosis associated with other physical condition
  - 294.0 Psychosis with endocrine disorder
  - 294.1 Psychosis with metabolic or nutritional disorder
  - 294.2 Psychosis with systemic infection
  - 294.3 Psychosis with drug or poison intoxication (other than alcohol)
  - 294.4 Psychosis with childbirth
  - 294.8 Psychosis with other and undiagnosed physical condition
  - 294.9 Psychosis with unspecified physical condition

=== Non-psychotic organic brain syndromes ===
- 309 Non-psychotic organic brain syndromes (mental disorders not specified as psychotic associated with physical conditions)
  - 309.0 Non-psychotic organic brain syndrome with intracranial infection
  - 309.1 Non-psychotic organic brain syndrome with drug, poison, or systemic intoxication
    - 309.13 Non-psychotic organic brain syndrome with alcohol (simple drunkenness)
    - 309.14 Non-psychotic organic brain syndrome with other drug, poison, or systemic intoxication
  - 309.2 Non-psychotic organic brain syndrome with brain trauma
  - 309.3 Non-psychotic organic brain syndrome with circulatory disturbance
  - 309.4 Non-psychotic organic brain syndrome with epilepsy
  - 309.5 Non-psychotic organic brain syndrome with disturbance of metabolism, growth, or nutrition
  - 309.6 Non-psychotic organic brain syndrome with senile or pre-senile brain disease
  - 309.7 Non-psychotic organic brain syndrome with intracranial neoplasm
  - 309.8 Non-psychotic organic brain syndrome with degenerative disease of the central nervous system
  - 309.9 Non-psychotic organic brain syndrome with other [and unspecified] physical condition
    - 309.91 Acute brain syndrome, not otherwise specified
    - 309.92 Chronic brain syndrome, not otherwise specified

== Psychoses not attributed to physical conditions listed previously ==
- 295 Schizophrenia
  - 295.0 Schizophrenia, simple type
  - 295.1 Schizophrenia, hebephrenic type
  - 295.2 Schizophrenia, catatonic type
    - 295.23 Schizophrenia, catatonic type, excited
    - 295.24 Schizophrenia, catatonic type, withdrawn
  - 295.3 Schizophrenia, paranoid type
  - 295.4 Acute schizophrenic episode
  - 295.5 Schizophrenia, latent type
  - 295.6 Schizophrenia, residual type
  - 295.7 Schizophrenia, schizo-affective type
    - 295.73 Schizophrenia, schizo-affective type, excited
    - 295.73 Schizophrenia, schizo-affective type, depressed
  - 295.8 Schizophrenia, childhood type
  - 295.90 Schizophrenia, chronic undifferentiated type
  - 295.99 Schizophrenia, other [and unspecified] types
- 296 Major affective disorders (affective psychoses)
  - 296.0 Involutional melancholia
  - 296.1 Manic-depressive illness, manic type (manic-depressive psychosis, manic type)
  - 296.2 Manic-depressive illness, depressed type (manic-depressive psychosis, depressed type)
  - 296.3 Manic-depressive illness, circular type (manic-depressive psychosis, circular type)
    - 296.33 Manic-depressive illness, circular type, manic
    - 296.34 Manic-depressive illness, circular type, depressed
  - 296.8 Other major affective disorder (affective psychoses, other)
  - 296.9 Unspecified major affective disorder
    - Affective disorder not otherwise specified (Note: Not coded)
    - Manic-depresive illness not otherwise specified
- 297 Paranoid states
  - 297.0 Paranoia
  - 297.1 Involutional paranoid state (involutional paraphrenia)
  - 297.9 Other paranoid state
- 298 Other psychoses
  - 298.0 Psychotic depressive reaction (reactive depressive psychosis)
  - 298.1 Reactive excitation
  - 298.2 Reactive confusion
    - Acute or subacute confusional state
  - 298.3 Acute paranoid reaction
  - 298.9 Reactive psychosis, unspecified
- 299 Unspecified psychosis
  - Dementia, insanity, or psychosis not otherwise specified

== Neuroses ==
- 300 Neuroses
  - 300.0 Anxiety neurosis
  - 300.1 Hysterical neurosis
    - 300.13 Hysterical neurosis, conversion type
    - 300.14 Hysterical neurosis, dissociative type
  - 300.2 Phobic neurosis
  - 300.3 Obsessive compulsive neurosis
  - 300.4 Depressive neurosis
  - 300.5 Neurasthenic neurosis (neurasthenia)
  - 300.6 Depersonalization neurosis (depersonalization syndrome)
  - 300.7 Hypochondriacal neurosis
  - 300.8 Other neurosis
  - 300.9 Unspecified neurosis

== Personality disorders and certain other non-psychotic mental disorders ==
- 301 Personality disorders
  - 301.0 Paranoid personality
  - 301.1 Cyclothymic personality (affective personality)
  - 301.2 Schizoid personality
  - 301.3 Explosive personality
  - 301.4 Obsessive compulsive personality (anankastic personality)
  - 301.5 Hysterical personality
  - 301.6 Asthenic personality
  - 301.7 Antisocial personality
  - 301.81 Passive-aggressive personality
  - 301.82 Inadequate personality
  - 301.89 Other personality disorders of specified types
  - 301.9 Unspecified personality disorder
- 302 Sexual deviations
  - 302.0 Sexual orientation disturbance (Note: Formerly homosexuality, replaced in 1973)
  - 302.1 Fetishism
  - 302.2 Pedophilia
  - 302.3 Transvestitism
  - 302.4 Exhibitionism
  - 302.5 Voyeurism
  - 302.6 Sadism
  - 302.7 Masochism
  - 302.8 Other sexual deviation
  - 302.9 Unspecified sexual deviation
- 303 Alcoholism
  - 303.0 Episodic excessive drinking
  - 303.1 Habitual excessive drinking
  - 303.2 Alcohol addiction
  - 303.9 Other [and unspecified] alcoholism
- 304 Drug dependence
  - 304.0 Drug dependence, opium, opium alkaloids and their derivatives
  - 304.1 Drug dependence, synthetic analgesics with morphine-like effects
  - 304.2 Drug dependence, barbiturates
  - 304.3 Drug dependence, other hypnotics and sedatives or "tranquilizers"
  - 304.4 Drug dependence, cocaine
  - 304.5 Drug dependence, Cannabis sativa (hasish, marihuana [sic])
  - 304.6 Drug dependence, other psycho-stimulants
  - 304.7 Drug dependence, hallucinogens
  - 304.8 Other drug dependence
  - 304.9 Unspecified drug dependence

== Psychophysiologic disorders ==
- 305 Psychophysiologic disorders (physical disorders of presumably psychogenic origin)
  - 305.0 Psychophysiologic skin disorder
  - 305.1 Psychophysiologic musculoskeletal disorder
  - 305.2 Psychophysiologic respiratory disorder
  - 305.3 Psychophysiologic cardiovascular disorder
  - 305.4 Psychophysiologic hemic and lymphatic disorder
  - 305.5 Psychophysiologic gastro-intestinal [sic] disorder
  - 305.6 Psychophysiologic genito-urinary disorder
  - 305.7 Psychophysiologic endocrine disorder
  - 305.8 Psychophysiologic disorder of organ of special sense
  - 305.9 Psychophysiologic disorder of other type

== Special symptoms ==
- 306 Special symptoms not elsewhere classified
  - 306.0 Speech disturbance
  - 306.1 Specific learning disturbance
  - 306.2 Tic
  - 306.3 Other psychomotor disorder
  - 306.4 Disorders of sleep
  - 306.5 Feeding disturbance
  - 306.6 Enuresis
  - 306.7 Encopresis
  - 306.8 Cephalalgia
  - 306.9 Other special symptom

== Transient situational disturbances ==
- 307 Transient situational disturbances (Note: Coded as 308 in the ICD-8)
  - 307.0 Adjustment reaction of infancy
  - 307.1 Adjustment reaction of childhood
  - 307.2 Adjustment reaction of adolescence
  - 307.3 Adjustment reaction of adult life
  - 307.4 Adjustment reaction of late life

== Behavior disorders of childhood and adolescence ==
- 308 Behavior disorders of childhood and adolescence (behavior disorders of childhood)
  - 308.0 Hyperkinetic reaction of childhood (or adolescence)
  - 308.1 Withdrawing reaction of childhood (or adolescence)
  - 308.2 Overanxious reaction of childhood (or adolescence)
  - 308.3 Runaway reaction of childhood (or adolescence)
  - 308.4 Unsocialized aggresive reaction of childhood (or adolescence)
  - 308.5 Group delinquent reaction of childhood (or adolescence)
  - 308.9 Other reaction of childhood (or adolescence)

== Conditions without manifest psychiatric disorder and non-specific conditions ==
- 316 Social maladjustments without manifest psychiatric disorder (Note: Listed as social maladjustment without manifest psychiatric disorder in the ICD-8) (Note: Coded as Y13 in the ICDA-8)
  - 316.0 Marital maladjustment
  - 316.1 Social maladjustment
  - 316.2 Occupational maladjustment
  - 316.3 Dyssocial behavior
  - 316.9 Other social maladjustment
- 317 Non-specific conditions
- 318 No mental disorder

== Non-diagnostic terms for administrative use ==
- 319 Non-diagnostic terms for administrative use (Note: The terms included in this category are listed under Special conditions and examinations without sickness in the ICD-8)
  - 319.0 Diagnosis deferred
  - 319.1 Boarder
  - 319.2 Experiment only
  - 319.9 Other

== Sources ==
- American Psychiatric Association (1968). Diagnostic and Statistical Manual of Mental Disorders (2nd ed.). American Psychiatric Association.
