= List of mental disorders in the DSM-I =

This is a list of mental disorders as defined in the first edition of the Diagnostic and Statistical Manual of Mental Disorders, and their corresponding ICD-6 diagnostic codes. Published by the American Psychiatric Association, it was released in 1952.

== Qualifying phrases ==
Qualifying phrases are additional codes specified in the fifth digit (i.e., second after the decimal place) of a given ICD code to describe the specific presentation of the disorder. These phrases are only used when the classification is not redundant (e.g., the use of .x1 with psychotic reaction for a psychotic disorder). The following phrases may be used for any disorder in the DSM-I where such use is not redundant: (Note: Qualifying phrases are typically not used for acute organic brain disorders, since the diagnosis already implies psychosis)

- .x1 With psychotic reaction
- .x2 With neurotic reaction
- .x3 With behavioral reaction

Additionally, the following qualifying phrases may be added to any disorder under chronic brain disorders where mental deficiency (intellectual disability) is a major feature of the disorder:

- .x4 Mental deficiency (Note: Intelligence quotient should also be reported)
  - .x41 Mental deficiency, mild
  - .x42 Mental deficiency, moderate
  - .x43 Mental deficiency, severe

Supplementary terms—additional specifiers of specific symptoms, medical conditions, and other classifiers—may also be listed alongside a DSM-I disorder when relevant. These supplementary terms have their own ICD codes.

== Disorders caused by or associated with impairment of brain tissue function ==
=== Acute brain disorders ===
==== Disorders due to or associated with infection ====
- 308.5 Acute brain syndrome associated with intracranial infection (Note: The specific infection should also be reported with this diagnosis)
- 308.3 Acute brain syndrome associated with systemic infection

==== Disorders due to or associated with intoxication ====
- 308.5 Acute brain syndrome, drug or poison intoxication (Note: The specific drug or poison should also be reported with this diagnosis)
- 307 Acute brain syndrome, alcohol intoxication
  - 307 Acute hallucinosis
  - 307 Delirium tremens

==== Disorders due to or associated with trauma ====
- 308.2 Acute brain syndrome associated with trauma (Note: The specific brain trauma should also be reported with this diagnosis)

==== Disorders due to or associated with circulatory disturbance ====
- 308.4 Acute brain syndrome associated with circulatory disturbance (Note: Cardiovascular disease should also be diagnosed)

==== Disorders due to associated with disturbance of innervation or psychic control ====
- 308.1 Acute brain syndrome associated with convulsive disorder (Note: A supplementary term should also be coded to indicate the presentation of this disorder)

==== Disorders due to or associated with disturbance of metabolism, growth, or nutrition ====
- 308.5 Acute brain syndrome with metabolic disturbance (Note: The specific metabolic disorder should also be reported with this diagnosis)

==== Disorders due to or associated with new growth ====
- 308.0 Acute brain syndrome associated with intracranial neoplasm (Note: The specific neoplasm should also be reported with this diagnosis)

==== Disorders due to unknown or uncertain cause ====
- 308.5 Acute brain syndrome with disease of unknown or uncertain cause (Note: The specific disease should also be reported with this diagnosis as an additional diagnosis)

==== Disorders due to unknown or uncertain cause with the functional reaction alone manifest [sic] ====
- 309.1 Acute brain syndrome of unknown cause

=== Chronic brain disorders ===
==== Disorders due to prenatal (constitutional) influence ====
- 328.0 Chronic brain syndrome associated with congenital cranial anomaly (Note: The specific cranial anomaly should also be reported with this diagnosis)
- 328.0 Chronic brain syndrome associated with congenital spastic paraplegia
- 328.0 Chronic brain syndrome associated with Mongolism
- 328.0 Chronic brain syndrome due to prenatal maternal infectious diseases

==== Disorders due to or associated with infection ====
- 026.9 Chronic brain syndrome associated with central nervous system syphilis
  - 025.9 Chronic brain syndrome associated with central nervous system syphilis, meningoencephalitic
  - 026.9 Chronic brain syndrome associated with central nervous system syphilis, meningovascular
  - 026.9 Chronic brain syndrome associated with other central nervous system syphilis
- 328.1 Chronic brain syndrome associated with intracranial infection other than syphilis

==== Disorders associated with intoxication ====
- 328.2 Chronic brain syndrome associated with intoxication
  - 328.2 Chronic brain syndrome, drug or poison intoxication
  - 322.9 Chronic brain syndrome, alcohol intoxication (Note: A qualifying phrase should be specified when known)

==== Disorders associated with trauma ====
- 328.3 Chronic brain syndrome associated with birth trauma
- 328.4 Chronic brain syndrome associated with brain trauma
  - 328.4 Chronic brain syndrome, brain trauma, gross force (Note: Not including trauma caused by a brain operation)
  - 328.4 Chronic brain syndrome following brain operation
  - 328.4 Chronic brain syndrome following electrical brain trauma
  - 328.4 Chronic brain syndrome following irradiational brain trauma

==== Disorders associated with circulatory disturbances ====
- 328.5 Chronic brain syndrome associated with cerebral arteriosclerosis
- 328.6 Chronic brain syndrome associated with circulatory disturbance other than cerebral arteriosclerosis (Note: The specific circulatory disorder should also be reported with this diagnosis)

==== Disorders associated with disturbances of innervation or of psychic control ====
- 353.9 Chronic brain syndrome associated with convulsive disorder

==== Disorders associated with disturbance of metabolism, growth or nutrition ====
- 794.9 Chronic brain syndrome associated with senile brain disease
- 328.8 Chronic brain syndrome associated with other disturbance of metabolism, growth or nutrition (includes presenile, glandular, pellagra, familial amaurosis)

==== Disorders associated with new growth ====
- 328.9 Chronic brain syndrome associated with intracranial neoplasm

==== Disorders associated with unknown or uncertain cause ====
- 328.9 Chronic brain syndrome associated with diseases of unknown or uncertain cause (includes multiple sclerosis, Huntington's chorea, Pick's disease and other diseases of a familial or hereditary nature)

==== Disorders due to unknown or uncertain cause with the functional reaction alone manifest ====
- 328.9 Chronic brain syndrome of unknown cause

== Mental deficiency ==
=== Disorders due to unknown or uncertain cause with the functional reaction alone manifest; hereditary and familial diseases of this nature ===
- 325.5 Mental deficiency (familial or hereditary)
  - 325.3 Mental deficiency (familial or hereditary), mild
  - 325.2 Mental deficiency (familial or hereditary), moderate
  - 325.1 Mental deficiency (familial or hereditary), severe

=== Disorders due to undetermined cause ===
- 325.5 Mental deficiency, idiopathic
  - 325.3 Mental deficiency, idiopathic, mild
  - 325.2 Mental deficiency, idiopathic, moderate
  - 325.1 Mental deficiency, idiopathic, severe

== Disorders of psychogenic origin or without clearly defined physical cause or structural change in the brain ==
=== Psychotic disorders ===
==== Disorders due to disturbance of metabolism, growth, nutrition or endocrine function ====
- 302 Involutional psychotic reaction

==== Disorders of psychogenic origin or without clearly defined tangible cause or structural change ====
- 301.2 Affective reactions
  - 301.0 Manic depressive reaction, manic type
  - 301.1 Manic depressive reaction, depressive type
  - 301.2 Manic depressive reaction, other
  - 309.0 Psychotic depressive reaction
- 300.7 Schizophrenic reactions
  - 300.0 Schizophrenic reaction, simple type
  - 300.1 Schizophrenic reaction, hebephrenic type
  - 300.2 Schizophrenic reaction, catatonic type
  - 300.3 Schizophrenic reaction, paranoid type
  - 300.4 Schizophrenic reaction, acute undifferentiated type
  - 300.7 Schizophrenic reaction, chronic undifferentiated type
  - 300.6 Schizophrenic reaction, schizo-affective [sic] type
  - 300.8 Schizophrenic reaction, childhood type
  - 300.5 Schizophrenic reaction, residual type
- 303 Paranoid reactions
  - 303 Paranoia
  - 303 Paranoid state
- 309.1 Psychotic reaction without clearly defined structural change, other than above

=== Psychophysiological autonomic and visceral disorders ===
==== Disorders due to disturbance of innervation or of psychic control ====
- 317.3 Psychophysiologic skin reaction
- 317.4 Psychophysiologic musculoskeletal reaction
- 317.0 Psychophysiologic respiratory reaction
- 315.2 Psychophysiologic cardiovascular reaction
- 317.5 Psychophysiologic hemic and lymphatic reaction
- 316.3 Psychophysiologic gastrointestinal reaction
- 371.1 Psychophysiologic genito-urinary reaction
- 317.5 Psychophysiologic endocrine reaction
- 318.3 Psychophysiologic nervous system reaction
- 317.5 Psychophysiologic reaction of organs of special sense

=== Psychoneurotic disorders ===
==== Disorders of psychogenic origin or without clearly defined tangible cause or structural change ====
- 318.5 Psychoneurotic reactions
  - 310 Anxiety reaction
  - 311 Dissociative reaction
  - 311 Conversion reaction
  - 312 Phobic reaction
  - 313 Obsessive compulsive reaction
  - 314 Depressive reaction
  - 318.5 Psychoneurotic reaction, other

=== Personality disorders ===
==== Disorders of psychogenic origin or without clearly defined tangible cause or structural change ====
- 320.7 Personality pattern disturbance
  - 320.3 Inadequate personality
  - 320.0 Schizoid personality
  - 320.2 Cyclothymic personality
  - 320.1 Paranoid personality
- 321.5 Personality trait disturbance
  - 321.0 Emotionally unstable personality
  - 321.1 Passive-aggressive personality
  - 321.5 Compulsive personality
  - 321.5 Personality trait disturbance, other
- 320.7 Sociopathic personality disturbance
  - 320.4 Antisocial reaction
  - 320.5 Dyssocial reaction
  - 320.6 Sexual deviation
  - Addiction (Note: Not coded)
    - 322.1 Alcoholism
    - 323 Drug addiction
- 321.4 Special symptom reactions
  - 326.0 Learning disturbance
  - 326.2 Speech disturbance
  - 321.3 Enuresis
  - 321.4 Somnambulism
  - 321.4 Special symptom reaction, other

=== Transient situational personality disorders ===
- 326.4 Transient situational personality disorder
  - 326.3 Gross stress reaction
  - 326.6 Adult situational reaction
  - 324.0 Adjustment reaction of infancy
  - 324.1 Adjustment reaction of childhood
    - 324.1 Habit disturbance
    - 324.1 Conduct disturbance
    - 324.1 Neurotic traits
  - 324.2 Adjustment reaction of adolescence
  - 326.5 Adjustment reaction of late life

== Nondiagnostic terms for hospital record ==
- 322.0 Alcohol intoxication (simple drunkenness)
- Y09 Boarder
- 795.5 Dead on admission
- 795.5 Diagnosis deferred
- 793.2 Disease none
- Y00.0 Examination only (Note: The first three digits of the code may be changed as needed)
- Y09 Experiment only
- 795.1 Malingerer
- 893.2 Observation
- Y00.3 Tests only

== Sources ==
- American Psychiatric Association (1952). Diagnostic and Statistical Manual of Mental Disorders (1st ed.). American Psychiatric Association.
