= History of bipolar disorder =

Cyclical variations in moods and energy levels have been recorded at least as far back as several thousand years. The words "melancholia" (an old word for depression) and "mania" have their etymologies in Ancient Greek. The word melancholia is derived from melas/μελας, meaning "black", and chole/χολη, meaning "bile" or "gall", indicative of the term's origins in pre-Hippocratic humoral theories. A man known as Aretaeus of Cappadocia has the first records of analyzing the symptoms of depression and mania in the 1st century of Greece.

Greek physician Soranus of Ephesus recommended the use of alkaline waters to treat those with mania or melancholia. Today, lithium is used as a treatment for bipolar disorder. Lithium may have been an ingredient in the Greek mineral waters.

Centuries passed and very little was studied or discovered. It wasn't until the mid-19th century that a French psychiatrist by the name of Jean-Pierre Falret wrote an article describing "circular insanity" and this is believed to be the first recorded diagnosis of bipolar disorder. Years later, in the early 1900s, Emil Kraepelin, a German psychiatrist, analyzed the influence of biology on mental disorders, including bipolar disorder. His studies are still used as the basis of classification of mental disorders today.

== The linguistic origins of mania in relation to bipolar disorder ==
The linguistic origins of mania, however, are not so clear-cut. Several etymologies are proposed by the Roman physician Caelius Aurelianus, including the Greek word ""ania", meaning to produce great mental anguish, and "manos", meaning relaxed or loose, which would contextually approximate to an excessive relaxing of the mind or soul. There are at least five other candidates, and part of the confusion surrounding the exact etymology of the word mania is its varied usage in the pre-Hippocratic poetry and mythologies.

== Relationship between mania and melancholia ==
The idea of a relationship between mania and melancholia can be traced back to at least the 2nd century AD. Soranus of Ephesus (98–177 AD) described mania and melancholia as distinct diseases with separate etiologies; however, he acknowledged that "many others consider melancholia a form of the disease of mania".

The earliest written descriptions of a relationship between mania and melancholia are attributed to Aretaeus of Cappadocia. Aretaeus was an eclectic medical philosopher who lived in Alexandria somewhere between 30 and 150 AD. Aretaeus is recognized as having authored most of the surviving texts referring to a unified concept of manic-depressive illness, viewing both melancholia and mania as having a common origin in "black bile".

== Origin of bipolar disorder as a mental illness ==
A clear understanding of bipolar disorder as a mental illness was recognized by early Chinese authors. The encyclopedist Gao Lian (c. 1583) describes the malady in his Eight Treatises on the Nurturing of Life (Zun Sheng Ba Qian).

The basis of the current conceptualisation of manic-depressive illness can be traced back to the 1850s; on January 31, 1854, Jules Baillarger described to the French Imperial Academy of Medicine a biphasic mental illness causing recurrent oscillations between mania and depression, which he termed folie à double forme ('dual-form insanity'). Two weeks later, on February 14, 1854, Jean-Pierre Falret presented a description to the academy on what was essentially the same disorder, and designated folie circulaire ('circular insanity') by him. The two bitterly disputed as to who had been the first to conceptualise the condition.

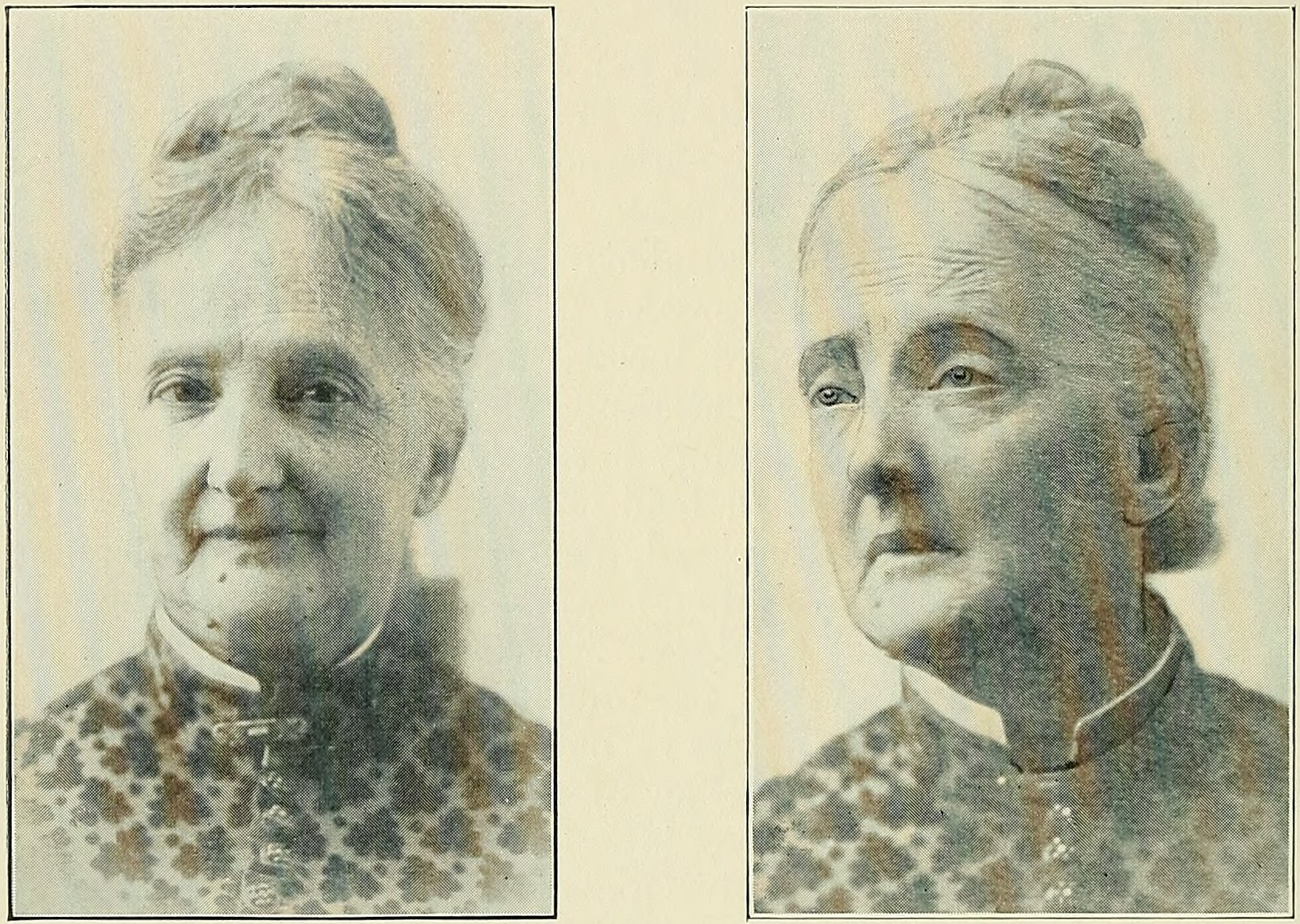
Woman with "circular insanity", showing manic (left) and depressed (right) states

These concepts were developed by the German psychiatrist Emil Kraepelin (1856–1926), who, using Kahlbaum's concept of cyclothymia, categorized and studied the natural course of untreated bipolar patients. He coined the term manic depressive psychosis, after noting that periods of acute illness, manic or depressive, were generally punctuated by relatively symptom-free intervals where the patient was able to function normally.

Kraepelin developed what is now known as the Kraepelinian dichotomy, the identification of two unique disease processes in mental illness, manic-depressive insanity and dementia praecox. Today, we know these illnesses as manic-depressive illness (bipolar disorder and recurrent unipolar depression) and schizophrenia.

=== Distinction between manic-depression with and without psychotic states ===
The first diagnostic distinction to be made between manic-depression involving psychotic states, and that which does not involve psychosis, came from Carl Jung in 1903. Jung's distinction is today referred to in the DSM-IV as that between 'bipolar I' (mania involving possible psychotic episodes) and 'bipolar II' (hypomania without psychosis). In his paper Jung introduced the non-psychotic version of the illness with the introductory statement, "I would like to publish a number of cases whose peculiarity consists in chronic hypomanic behaviour" where "it is not a question of real mania at all but of a hypomanic state which cannot be regarded as psychotic". Jung illustrated the non-psychotic variation with 5 case histories, each involving hypomanic behaviour, occasional bouts of depression, and mixed mood states, which involved personal and interpersonal upheaval for each patient.

== Initial treatment options ==
After World War II, John Cade, an Australian psychiatrist was investigating the effects of various compounds on patients with manic depressive psychosis. In 1948, Cade discovered that lithium could be used as a successful treatment of manic depressive psychosis. Because there was a fear that table salt substitutes could lead to toxicity or death, his findings did not immediately lead to treatments.

Mogens Schou organized a randomly controlled trial for mania using lithium in 1954. Schou and colleagues later researched lithium extensively. Before the advent of lithium, barbiturates were the standard treatment for mania. In the 1950s, U.S. hospitals began experimenting with lithium on their patients. By the mid-60s, reports started appearing in the medical literature regarding lithium's effectiveness. The U.S. Food and Drug Administration did not approve of lithium's use until 1970.

== Progression from manic-depressive "reaction" to manic-depressive "illness" ==
The term "manic-depressive reaction" appeared in the first American Psychiatric Association Diagnostic Manual in 1952, influenced by the legacy of Adolf Meyer who had introduced the paradigm illness as a reaction of biogenetic factors to psychological and social influences. Subclassification of bipolar disorder was first proposed by German psychiatrist Karl Leonhard in 1957; he was also the first to introduce the terms bipolar (for those with mania) and unipolar (for those with depressive episodes only).

In 1968, both the newly revised classification systems ICD-8 and DSM-II termed the condition "manic-depressive illness" as biological thinking came to the fore.

== Current classification of bipolar disorder ==
The current nosology, bipolar disorder, became popular in 1980, and some individuals prefer the older term because it provides a better description of a continually changing multi-dimensional illness.

Empirical and theoretical work on bipolar disorder has throughout history "seesawed" between psychological and biological ways of understanding. Despite the work of Kraepelin (1921) emphasizing the psychosocial context, conceptions of bipolar disorder as a genetically based illness dominated the 20th century. Since the 1990s, however, there has been a resurgence of interest and research into the role of psychosocial processes.

== See also ==
- Bipolar disorder
- Outline of bipolar disorder
