= Kraepelinian dichotomy =

Aspect of psychosis

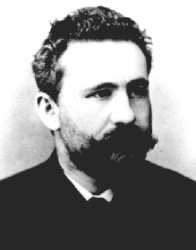
Emil Kraepelin (1856–1926)

The Kraepelinian dichotomy is the division of the major endogenous psychoses into the disease concepts of dementia praecox, which was reformulated as schizophrenia by Eugen Bleuler by 1908, and manic-depressive psychosis, which has now been reconceived as bipolar disorder. This division was formally introduced in the sixth edition of Emil Kraepelin's psychiatric textbook Psychiatrie. Ein Lehrbuch für Studierende und Aerzte, published in 1899. It has been highly influential on modern psychiatric classification systems, the DSM and ICD, and is reflected in the taxonomic separation of schizophrenia from affective psychosis. However, there is also a diagnosis of schizoaffective disorder to cover cases that seem to show symptoms of both.

== History ==
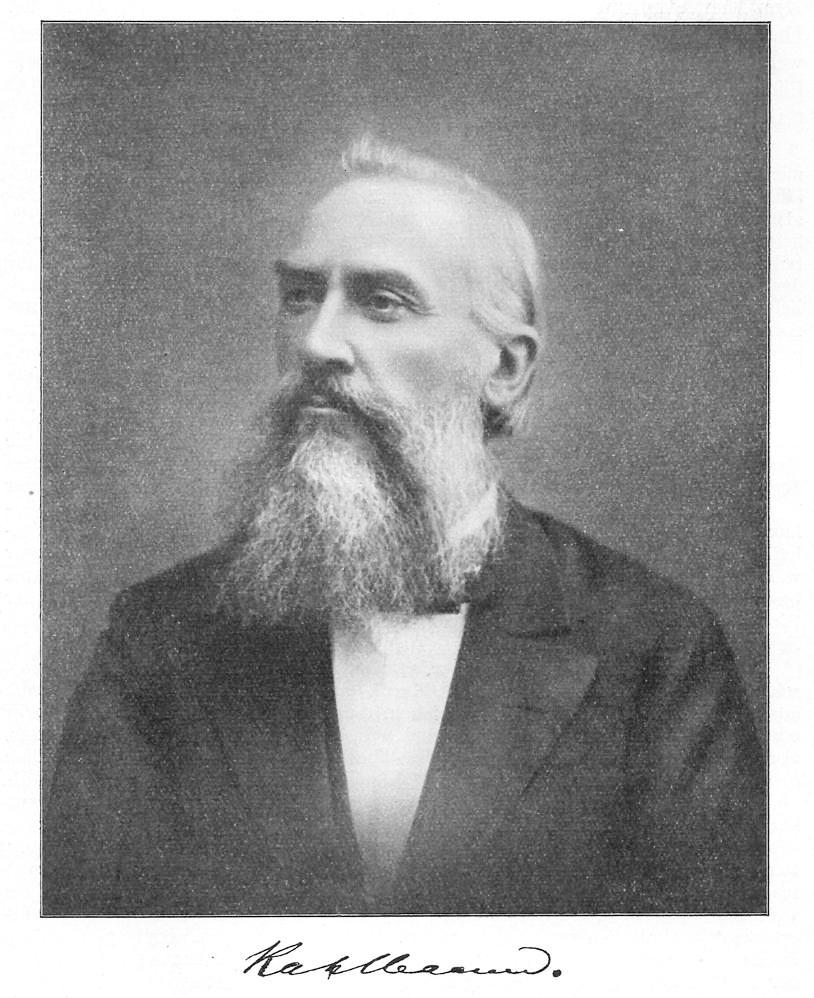
Karl Ludwig Kahlbaum (1828–1899)

The Kraepelinian system and the modern classification of psychoses are ultimately derived from the insights of Karl Kahlbaum. In 1863 the Prussian psychiatrist published his habilitation which was entitled, Die Gruppierung der psychischen Krankheiten (The Classification of Psychiatric Diseases). In this text he reviewed the then heterogeneous state of medical taxonomies of mental illness and enumerated the existence of some thirty such nosologies from the early seventeenth-century until the mid-nineteenth-century. The major contribution of his published dissertation, which is still the foundation of modern psychiatric nosology, was to first formulate the clinical method for the classification of psychosis by symptom, course and outcome.

Kahlbaum also differentiated between two major groups of mental illnesses which he termed vecordia and vesania.

Emil Kraepelin first introduced his proposed dichotomy between the endogenous psychoses of manic-depressive illness and dementia praecox during a public lecture in Heidelberg, Germany on 27 November 1898.

== Concept Overview ==
Central to Kraepelin’s theory was the idea that the longitudinal course of an illness was more reliable, as compared to cross-sectional symptom presentation, when it came to classification. Central to this shift was Kraepelin’s fifth edition of Psychiatrie (1896), written under the influence of Karl Ludwig Kahlbaum. In this work, he moved away from clinical syndromes and classified psychiatric diagnoses by progression of disease.

Dementia praecox itself was characterized as disordered intellectual functioning with progressive deterioration and no hopes of recovery. On the other hand, manic-depressive illness was considered a disorder of affect, with periods of exacerbation and remission, and some accounts of complete recovery.

Though Kraepelin was a proponent of this theory, he recognized the boundary was not clear. Near the end of his career, in his 1912 introduction to clinical psychiatry Kraepelin did not define dementia praecox solely by its chronic course and poor outcomes. In fact, he acknowledged remission and full recovery might be possible (similar to manic-depressive illness), and instead focused on how bizarre delusions and passive symptoms are defining clinical characteristics of dementia praecox.

== Critical Perspectives ==
Later analysis indicated that Kraepelin’s theory was based on the clinical population he primarily worked with, those with long inpatient stays. This skew in population and therefore severity, likely led him to overestimate the progressive decline in dementia praecox. Eugen Bleuler, who later coined the term schizophrenia, noted that not all patients had a progressive decline, a perspective that broadened the diagnosis from Kraepelin’s original formulation.

In fact, later statistical analysis of cases Kraepelin and collaborators studied in 1908 at a Munich clinic found a sampling bias. As he analyzed 53 dementia praecox cases, and 134 manic-depressive insanity cases, it was suggested that his concept of dementia praecox had narrow clinical criteria compared to schizophrenia, and that his understanding of manic-depressive illness likely included cases characterized as schizoaffective disorder.

=== Limitations ===
In the last century, clinical work in psychiatry has proceeded under the assumption that schizophrenia and bipolar disorder are distinct entities with separate disease processes and treatment. However, many individuals with severe psychiatric illness present with both mood and psychotic symptoms. During the 1980’s, the reliability of the diagnostic criteria was challenged, though it was never abandoned.

=== Psychosis Continuum Hypothesis ===
Some researchers have proposed that functional psychoses are better understood on a spectrum. According to Craddock and Owen, the continuum extends from unipolar depression, bipolar affective, schizoaffective, to schizophrenia with increasing frequency of neuropsychological deficit. Empirical work has produced mixed results, studies using the schizo-bipolar scale find that while the majority of cases are near the poles, about 45% of cases are on the continuum, indicating no clear dichotomy.

=== Genetic and Neurobiological Evidence ===
A 2009 study by Lichtenstein examined more than 2 million families in Sweden and found that first-degree relatives of individuals with either schizophrenia or bipolar disorder, were at increased risk of either disorder. Also in 2009, the International Schizophrenia Consortium shared results from a genome-wide association study that confirmed overlap of polygenic variation between the two diagnoses.

Additionally, prenatal and immunological dysfunction have also been identified as risk factors for both diagnoses, with some gestational exposure present in both and specific to one.

== Clinical Impact ==
=== Influence on DSM ===
The dichotomy can be seen in the DSM’s taxonomic separation of schizophrenia from affective psychosis, with schizoaffective disorder covering cases that show symptoms of both. Within the DSM-5 and ICD-10 framework, schizoaffective disorder appears to function as a “not otherwise specified: category, as it is used when clinical presentation does not nearly match either schizophrenia or bipolar disorder.

=== Treatment Implications ===
Pharmacology has offered evidence that both supports and is against the dichotomy. The use of mood stabilizers, such as lithium, valproate, and carbamazepine, specifically to treat bipolar disorder supports the distinction. On the other hand, the therapeutic benefit of antipsychotics, like olanzapine across both conditions, speaks against it. Critics have argued that the categorical framework impedes treatment research, as cases with both psychotic and bipolar features are often excluded from trials or combined with other diagnostic classifications.

== Broader Context ==
=== Alternative Framework ===
Several other nosological frameworks have been shared. Some examples include Crow’s continuum model, Angst and Akiskal, Marnero’s focus on schizoaffective illness, and the polychotomous Leonhardian diagnostic system. Other perspectives have also been advocated for, including a dimensional approach. In this theory, continuous symptoms are influenced by two major factors: a neurodevelopmental impairment factor and an affective-socially reactive factor. The neurodevelopmental impairment factor is typically associated with negative psychotic symptoms, family history of schizophrenia, and poor outcomes. Alternatively, the affective-socially reactive factor is associated with positive psychotic symptoms, family history or affective disorder, and better outcomes.

=== Contemporary Relevance ===
A substantial amount of genetic evidence suggests that schizophrenia and bipolar disorder share an overlap in genetic risk, implying similar aspects of pathogenesis, which would be inconsistent with Kraeplin’s theory. As of 2026, the Kraepelinian dichotomy is still considered partly valid though results from studies indicate no clear consensus.

== See also ==
- Comparison of bipolar disorder and schizophrenia
- History of bipolar disorder
- History of schizophrenia

== Bibliography ==
- Angst, J. (2002). "Historical aspects of the dichotomy between manic-depressive disorders and schizophrenia". Schizophrenia Research. 57 (1): 5–13. doi:10.1016/S0920-9964(02)00328-6. PMID 12165371. S2CID 33585559.
- Angst, J.; Gamma, A. (2008). "Diagnosis and course of affective psychoses: was Kraepelin right?" (PDF). European Archives of Psychiatry and Clinical Neuroscience. 258: 107–10. doi:10.1007/s00406-008-2013-2. PMID 18516522. S2CID 34384739.
- Berrios, German E.; Luque, Rogelio; Villagrán, José M. (2003). "Schizophrenia: a conceptual history". International Journal of Psychology and Psychological Therapy. 3 (2): 111–40.
- Bora, E.; Yucel, M.; Fornito, A.; Berk, M.; Pantelis, C. (2008). "Major psychoses with mixed psychotic and mood symptoms: are mixed psychoses associated with different neurobiological markers?". Acta Psychiatrica Scandinavica. 118 (3): 172–87. doi:10.1111/j.1600-0447.2008.01230.x. ISSN 0001-690X. PMID 18699952. S2CID 205802830.
- Briole, G. (2012). "Emil Kraepelin: The Fragility of a Colossal Oeuvre". Hurly-Burly 8: 125–147.
- Craddock, N.; Owen, M.J. (2005). "The beginning of the end for the Kraepelinian dichotomy". British Journal of Psychiatry. 186 (5): 364–6. doi:10.1192/bjp.186.5.364. PMID 15863738.
- Craddock, N.; Owen, M. J. (2010). "The Kraepelinian dichotomy - going, going... but still not gone". The British Journal of Psychiatry. 196 (2): 92–5. doi:10.1192/bjp.bp.109.073429. ISSN 0007-1250. PMC 2815936. PMID 20118450.
- Crow, T. J. (2008). "Craddock & Owen vs Kraepelin: 85 years late, mesmerised by 'polygenes'". Schizophrenia Research. 103 (1–3): 156–60. doi:10.1016/j.schres.2008.03.001. PMID 18434093. S2CID 12676461.
- Cuesta, M. J.; Peralta, V. (2009). "Psychopathological assessment of schizophrenia: relevance for classification". Current Psychiatry Reports. 11 (4): 324–31. doi:10.1007/s11920-009-0047-4. PMID 19635242. S2CID 34738750.
- Decker, Hannah S. (2007). "How Kraepelinian was Kraepelin? How Kraepelinian are the neo-Kraepelinians? - from Emil Kraepelin to the DSM-III" (PDF). History of Psychiatry. 18 (3): 337–60. doi:10.1177/0957154X07078976. hdl:2262/51628. PMID 18175636. S2CID 19754009.
- deVries, M. W (2008). "Multifactorial inheritance, rates of maturation and psychiatry's taxonomic dilemma". European Archives of Psychiatry and Clinical Neuroscience. 258: 25–8. doi:10.1007/s00406-008-2005-2. PMID 18516513. S2CID 19974805.
- Fischer, B. A.; Carpenter, W. T. (2009). "Will the Kraepelinian Dichotomy Survive DSM-V?". Neuropsychopharmacology. 34 (9): 2081–7. doi:10.1038/npp.2009.32. PMC 2721021. PMID 19295511.
- Gaebel, W.; Zielasek, J. (2008). "The DSM-V initiative "deconstructing psychosis" in the context of Kraepelin's concept on nosology". European Archives of Psychiatry and Clinical Neuroscience. 258 (Suppl. 2): 41–7. doi:10.1007/s00406-008-2009-y. PMID 18516517. S2CID 29574424.
- Greene, Talya (2007). "The Kraepelinian dichotomy: the twin pillars crumbling?" (PDF). History of Psychiatry. 18 (3): 361–79. doi:10.1177/0957154X07078977. hdl:2262/51629. PMID 18175637. S2CID 12158661.
- Häfner, Heinz; Heiden, Wolfram an der; Maurer, Kurt (2008). "Evidence for separate diseases?". European Archives of Psychiatry and Clinical Neuroscience. 258 (Suppl. 2): 85–96. doi:10.1007/s00406-008-2011-4. PMID 18516520. S2CID 24800860.
- Hippius, H.; Müller, N. (2008). "The work of Emil Kraepelin and his research group in München". European Archives of Psychiatry and Clinical Neuroscience. 258 (Suppl. 2): 3–11. doi:10.1007/s00406-008-2001-6. PMID 18516510. S2CID 29850296.
- Jablensky, Assen (1999). "The conflict of the nosologists: views on schizophrenia and manic-depressive illness in the early part of the 20th century". Schizophrenia Research. 39 (2): 95–100. doi:10.1016/S0920-9964(99)00106-1. PMID 10507518. S2CID 27097154.
- Jablensky, Assen (2007). "Living in a Kraepelinian world. Kraepelin's impact on modern psychiatry" (PDF). History of Psychiatry. 18 (3): 381–8. doi:10.1177/0957154X07079690. hdl:2262/51631. PMID 18175638. S2CID 33487387.
- Kahlbaum, Karl Ludwig (1863). Die Gruppierung der psychischen Krankheiten und die Eintheilung der Seelenstörungen: Entwurf einer historisch-kritischen Darstellung der bisherigen Eintheilungen und Versuch zur Anbahnung einer empirisch-wissenschaftlichen Grundlage der Psychiatrie als klinischer Disciplin. Danzig: Kafemann.
- Maier, Wolfgang (2006). "Do schizoaffective disorders exist at all?". Acta Psychiatrica Scandinavica. 113 (5): 369–371. doi:10.1111/j.1600-0447.2006.00763.x. ISSN 0001-690X. PMID 16603028. S2CID 22029255.
- Möller, Hans-Jürgen; Bottlender, R.; Gross, A; Hoff, P.; Wittmann, J.; Wegner, U.; Strauss, A. (2002). "The Kraepelinian dichotomy: preliminary results of a 15-year follow-up study on functional psychoses: focus on negative symptoms". Schizophrenia Research. 56 (1–2): 87–94. doi:10.1016/S0920-9964(01)00252-3. PMID 12084423. S2CID 28477589.
- Möller, Hans-Jürgen (2008). "Systematic of psychiatric disorders between categorical and dimensional approaches: Kraepelin's dichotomy and beyond". European Archives of Psychiatry and Clinical Neuroscience. 258 (Suppl. 2): 48–73. doi:10.1007/s00406-008-2004-3. PMID 18516518. S2CID 35482134.
- Müller, N.; Schwarz, M. J (2008). "A psychoneuroimmunological perspective to Emil Kraepelins dichotomy". European Archives of Psychiatry and Clinical Neuroscience. 258: 97–106. doi:10.1007/s00406-008-2012-3. PMID 18516521. S2CID 25050832.
- Noll, Richard (2007). The Encyclopedia of Schizophrenia and other Psychotic Disorders (3rd ed.). New York: Infobase Publishing. ISBN 978-0-8160-6405-2.
- Palm, Ulrich; Möller, Hans-Jürgen (2011). "Reception of Kraepelin's ideas 1900–1960". Psychiatry and Clinical Neurosciences. 65 (4): 318–325. doi:10.1111/j.1440-1819.2011.02226.x. PMID 21682810.
- Pilgrim, D. (2002). "The biopsychosocial model in Anglo-American psychiatry: past, present and future". Journal of Mental Health. 11 (6): 585–94. CiteSeerX 10.1.1.413.4801. doi:10.1080/09638230020023930. S2CID 17957615.
- Radden, Jennifer (1996). "Lumps and Bumps:Kantian Faculty Psychology, Phrenology, and Twentieth-Century Psychiatric Classification". Philosophy, Psychiatry, & Psychology. 3 (1): 1–14. doi:10.1353/ppp.1996.0008. ISSN 1086-3303. S2CID 143590585.
- Roelcke, Volker (1997). "Biologizing social facts: An early 20th century debate on Kraepelin's concepts of culture, neurasthenia, and degeneration". Culture, Medicine and Psychiatry. 21 (4): 383–403. doi:10.1023/A:1005393121931. PMID 9492972. S2CID 30190500.
- Rogler, L.H. (1997). "Making Sense of Historical Changes in the Diagnostic and Statistical Manual of Mental Disorders: Five Propositions". Journal of Health and Social Behavior. 38 (1): 9–20. doi:10.2307/2955358. JSTOR 2955358. PMID 9097505.
- Stefanis, N. (2008). "Genes do not read DSM-IV: implications for psychosis classification". Annals of General Psychiatry. 7 (Suppl 1) S68. doi:10.1186/1744-859X-7-S1-S68.
