= Jacob S. Kasanin =

Russian born psychiatrist (1897-1946)

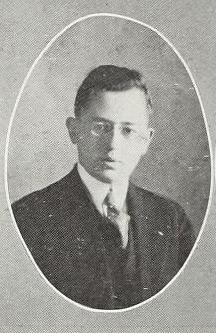
- Born: 11 May 1897; Slavgorod
- Died: Date of death: May 4, 1946 (aged 48)
- Education: University of Michigan
- Occupation: Psychiatrist
- Known for: Schizoaffective disorder

Jacob Sergi Kasanin (1897-1946) was a Russian born, American trained psychiatrist who introduced the term acute schizoaffective psychoses in 1933. He was known as Yasha to those close to him. He was born in Slavgorod, on 11 May 1897, and moved to the United States in 1915. He graduated from the University of Michigan with a Bachelor of Science in 1919, Doctor of Medicine in 1921 and a Master of Science in Public health in 1926.

He went on to train is both Psychiatry and Neurology at Boston State Hospital, Boston Psychopathic Hospital and Mount Sinai Hospital in New York. From 1928 to 1932 he was a Senior Research associate at Boston Psychopathic Hospital studying social causes of Mental disorder. When Director of the Department of Mental Hygiene of the Federated Jewish Charities in Boston his research interest was blood sugar curves in Epidemic encephalitis.

Whilst in Russia in 1930 he became acquainted with Lev Vygotsky and his work. He translated his work Thought In Schizophrenia into English.

In 1933 in The American Journal of Psychiatry he published a paper entitled '"The Acute Schizoaffective Psychoses" which he had presented at the 88th Annual Meeting of the American Psychiatric Association in Philadelphia in May or June 1932. In his article Kasanin described 9 cases studies who had both schizophrenic or Psychotic symptoms and Affective symptoms.

Whilst at the Michael Reese Hospital he conducted research with Eugenia Hanfmann on Schizophrenic thinking this was following on from Vygotsky's work and was funded by the Masonic Foundation. Together they wrote Conceptual Thinking in Schizophrenia, from this a test was developed called the Hanfmann-Kasanin Test.

From 1939 he was Chief of Psychiatry at Mount Zion Hospital in San Francisco and Assistant Clinical Professor at UCSF School of Medicine. He also engaged in Private Practice.

He was president of the Association of American Orthopsychiatrists from 1941 to 1942. During World War II he served as a psychiatrist to the 9th service command of the army.

He died suddenly on the 4 May 1946.

== Publications ==
- Kasanin, Jacob. "THE BLOOD SUGAR CURVE IN MENTAL DISEASE: II. THE SCHIZOPHRENIC (DEMENTIA PRAECOX) GROUPS." Archives of Neurology and Psychiatry (Chicago)16.4 (1926): 414-19
- Kasanin J., Knapp E. External factors causing variable results in the Kottmann reaction, 1926
- Kasanin J., Petersen J.N. Psychosis as an early sign of epidemic encephalitis, 1926
- The Acute Schizoaffective Psychoses. American Journal of Psychiatry 90, 1933
- Pavlov's Theory of Schizophrenia, 1932
- Bowman K.M., Kasanin J. Constitutional Schizophrenia, 1933
- Kasanin J., Hanfmann E. An experimental study of concept formation in schizophrenia. Quantitative analysis of the results. American Journal of Psychiatry 95, ss. 35–48, 1938
- Hanfmann E., Kasanin J. Conceptual thinking in schizophrenia. New York: Nervous and Mental Disease Monographs, 1942
- Language and Thought in Schizophrenia, 1944
- Criteria of Therapy of War Neuroses American Journal of Psychiatry 104, 1947
- Kasanin J.S. (ed.), Language and Thought in Schizophrenia. Collected papers. With a Preface by Nolan D.C. Lewis, University of California Press, Berkeley and Los Angeles 1951
