= Involutional melancholia =

Historical psychiatric diagnosis

Involutional melancholia or involutional depression is a traditional name for a supposed psychiatric disorder which was thought to affect mainly elderly or late middle-aged people, often in association with paranoia.

As with other historical descriptions of melancholia, this diagnostic label is not recognized as a psychiatric disorder by the DSM-5, the American Psychiatric Association's (APA) classification and diagnostic tool.

== History ==
In 1907, the German psychiatrist Emil Kraepelin was the first to propose (in the seventh edition of his influential textbook) the existence of involutional melancholia as a distinct clinical entity, separate from the manic-depressive psychosis. At the time, he believed that 'the processes of involution in the body are suited to engender mournful or anxious moodiness', and that this could help explain the more frequent occurrence of depression among elderly people. Later, Kraepelin's stance changed, broadly in line with the results of a study he had commissioned by his colleague Georges L. Dreyfus: by the time of the publication of the eighth edition of his textbook in 1913, he had incorporated involutional melancholia under the general heading of 'manic-depressive illness'.

Dreyfus had challenged (in 1907) Kraepelin's concept of an acquired origin, maintaining it to be endogenous in origin (although statistical review of Dreyfus's analysis of his case series has questioned his conclusion that the natural history of involutional melancholia was similar to that of depression in younger people). Some debate about its status as a potential clinical entity, as well as possible causation - endogenous or environmental - continued into the late twentieth century. It was noted that whereas "involutional melancholy was conceptualized as an acquired rather than constitutional disorder, these ideas have not survived careful scrutiny."

== Characteristics ==
Symptoms were thought to include agitation, depersonalization, and delusions of bodily change, in the absence of manic features. Symptoms of fear were also considered to occur, as well as despondency and hypochondriacal delusions. In the absence of treatment, the disorder was thought to have a prolonged, deteriorating course with poor prognosis.

== Treatments ==
Involutional melancholia was classically treated with antidepressants and mood elevators.

Electroconvulsive therapy (ECT) was also used. Around the mid-twentieth century, there was some consensus that ECT was the most effective treatment option, and could prevent years of hospitalization. (Such an approach has also been reported in the 21st century.)

=== Psychoanalysis ===
Otto Fenichel considered that "psychoanalytically, not much is known about the structure and mechanism of involutional melancholias; they seem to occur in personalities with an outspoken compulsive character of an especially rigid nature. In the climacterium the compulsive defensive systems fail."

== See also ==
- Geriatric psychiatry
- Late life depression
