= Eugenia Hanfmann =

Russian born, American psychologist (1905–1983)

Eugenia Hanfmann (March 3, 1905 - September 14, 1983) was an American psychologist and educator who was born in Russia. Early in her career, Hanfmann was associated with Kurt Koffka and the Gestalt movement of psychology. Later she conducted research and published on schizophrenia and personality assessment. Hanfmann established a counseling service at Brandeis University and helped form its psychology department with Abraham Maslow. Hanfmann is considered to be one of the early pioneers of women in psychology.

== Early life ==
Hanfmann was born on March 3, 1905, in St. Petersburg, Russia to her father, Maxim Ganfman, and mother, Katarina. Her father was raised in a Jewish family before converting to the Russian Orthodox Church when he married Katarina. Eugenia Hanfmann was the oldest of four children and the only daughter. Her brothers were George, Alexander, and Andrew.

Growing up, Hanfmann's family was part of a progressive Russian intelligentsia class. She had several educated female role-models in her life, such as her mother, who was a college educated part-time teacher, and her aunt, who was a physician. Hanfmann described psychology as an early interest. She had a "vivid memory of reading William James’ short Psychology during a bombardment of Kiev..."

Hanfmann was twelve years old at the beginning of the Russian Revolution. In an autobiography, she wrote, "during the years of civil war and famine, our concern was to stay alive today and tomorrow". After the civil war, her family moved to Lithuania and she resumed her education graduating with a high school diploma. In 1922, her family moved to Berlin, Germany, and their last name was converted from Cyrillic version, Ganfman, to the Latin alphabet, Hanfmann.

== Education and training ==
In 1923, Hanfmann began her college education at the University of Jena in Germany. She studied psychology, education, philosophy, and philology. Her mentor professor was Wilhelm Peters, an Austrian Jew and socialist at the university. Hanfmann described Peters as being especially important in her education, saying he “transformed [her] school life.” He assigned her thesis problem, which she published and received her doctorate in 1927.

After earning her doctoral degree, Hanfmann says she was unable to find work in academia due to ethnic and language barriers. However, in 1928, with Peters as her sponsor, Hanfmann joined the staff at the University of Jena. In 1930, Peters recommended Hanfmann to Kurt Koffka, one of the early developers of Gestalt psychology, for a research assistant position on Koffka's staff. She was chosen for the position. Hanfmann obtained a visa and went to work with Koffka at Smith College in the United States. There she became colleagues with Tamara Dembo. Together Hanfmann and Dembo would collaborate on a number of projects throughout their careers.

== Career and research ==
In 1932, Hanfmann was hired to work at Worcester State Hospital in Massachusetts as a research psychologist by the hospital's Chief Psychologist and Director of Psychological Research, David Shakow. During this time Hanfmann gained clinical experience and was able to perform a number of psychological studies, one of which was with Dembo on new patients’ reaction to the hospital. Part of her research at the hospital was focused on schizophrenia, which brought her into contact with psychiatrist Jacob Kasanin in Chicago.

In 1936, Hanfmann left Worcester State Hospital with a grant from Masonic Foundation to continue research on schizophrenia. She joined Kasanin in Chicago at Michael Reese Hospital, where the pair collected data and wrote more papers on this subject. Together they continued the work of Russian psychologist Lev Vygotsky. Hanfmann would later, in 1962, translate and publish Vysotsky's book Thoughts and Language in English. They also developed the Hanfmann-Kasanin Test, used as a measurement of schizophrenic thought disturbance, and published Conceptual Thinking in Schizophrenia in 1942.

Starting in 1939, Hanfmann began working at Mount Holyoke College as an instructor and then assistant professor. She taught a number of courses at the university dealing with general psychology. During this time, she was able to help her mother and brothers come to the U.S. and escape war-torn Europe.

In 1944, Hanfmann took a leave of absence from Mount Holyoke College and accepted an invitation to work for the U.S. government as a senior instructor of the assessment staff in the Assessment Program of the Office of Strategic Services (OSS), an intelligence agency during World War II that would eventually become the CIA. There she worked with other psychologists evaluating “people volunteering for service overseas” during the Second World War. Hanfmann described this job positively. She was only frustrated at the end of the war for having to burn all OSS records and notes on those they had interviewed “instead of looking for answers to the intriguing questions of personality theory in the… men I had interviewed.”

After the war, instead of returning to Mount Holyoke College, Hanfman became a lecturer at Harvard University, from 1946 to 1952, in the psychology department. While there she took part in Harvard's Russian Research Center's project on the Soviet social system. In this personality study, she interviewed displaced Soviet citizens “as informants about life behind the Iron Curtain.” Based on this research, in 1976 she and her colleague Helen Beier published a book, Six Russian Men: Lives in Turmoil.

Hanfmann describes in her autobiography being among the minority of women employed at the different institutions throughout her career. Sometimes she was the only woman in the workplace. She highlights how some of her male colleagues had low expectations of women. At Harvard, Hanfmann was recommended by her chairman for a three-year reappointment, only to be rejected by the dean. According to Hanfmann, the dean's reason for this was that it would have entitled her to attend faculty meetings “and no woman had ever attended a meeting of the Harvard Faculty of Arts and Sciences!” In her next three year reappointment, she was allowed to attend faculty meetings.

In 1952, Hanfmann was invited by Abraham Maslow to start a counseling service for students at Brandeis University and join the new psychology department as an associate professor for psychology and director of the Student Counseling Center. Hanfmann described this as an opportunity to create psychological services that were available for all students, or "emotional education for the well", not just those who were ill. In 1956, she became a full professor of psychology at Brandeis. In 1972, Hanfmann retired as professor emeritus. She published Psychological Counseling in a Small College in 1963 and Effective Therapy for College Students in 1978.

== Death and controversy ==
Hanfmann had a cerebral stroke and died two weeks later at the age of 78 on September 14, 1983, at Waltham Hospital.

In 2010, William R. Woodward, a professor at the University of New Hampshire, wrote in his paper, "Russian women émigrées in psychology: Informal Jewish networks," that Hanfmann and two other Russian women psychologists depend upon the patronage of Jewish mentors and networks of patronage by sympathetic male psychologists. Woodward also seemed to identify these women as Jewish, but in association rather than by self identification. In rebuttal to Woodward's paper, Frances Cherry, Rhoda Unger, and Anderw S. Winston published "Gender, ethnicity, and career trajectories: A comment on Woodward" in the journal History of Psychology. They argued "that these women were part of an active network of Gestaltists, topologists, and Society for the Psychological Study of Social Issues leaders, and that any help that they received may be explained by the shared theoretical and disciplinary outlook of these groups as opposed to a 'Jewish network'".
