= Mogens Schou =

Danish psychiatrist (1918-2005)

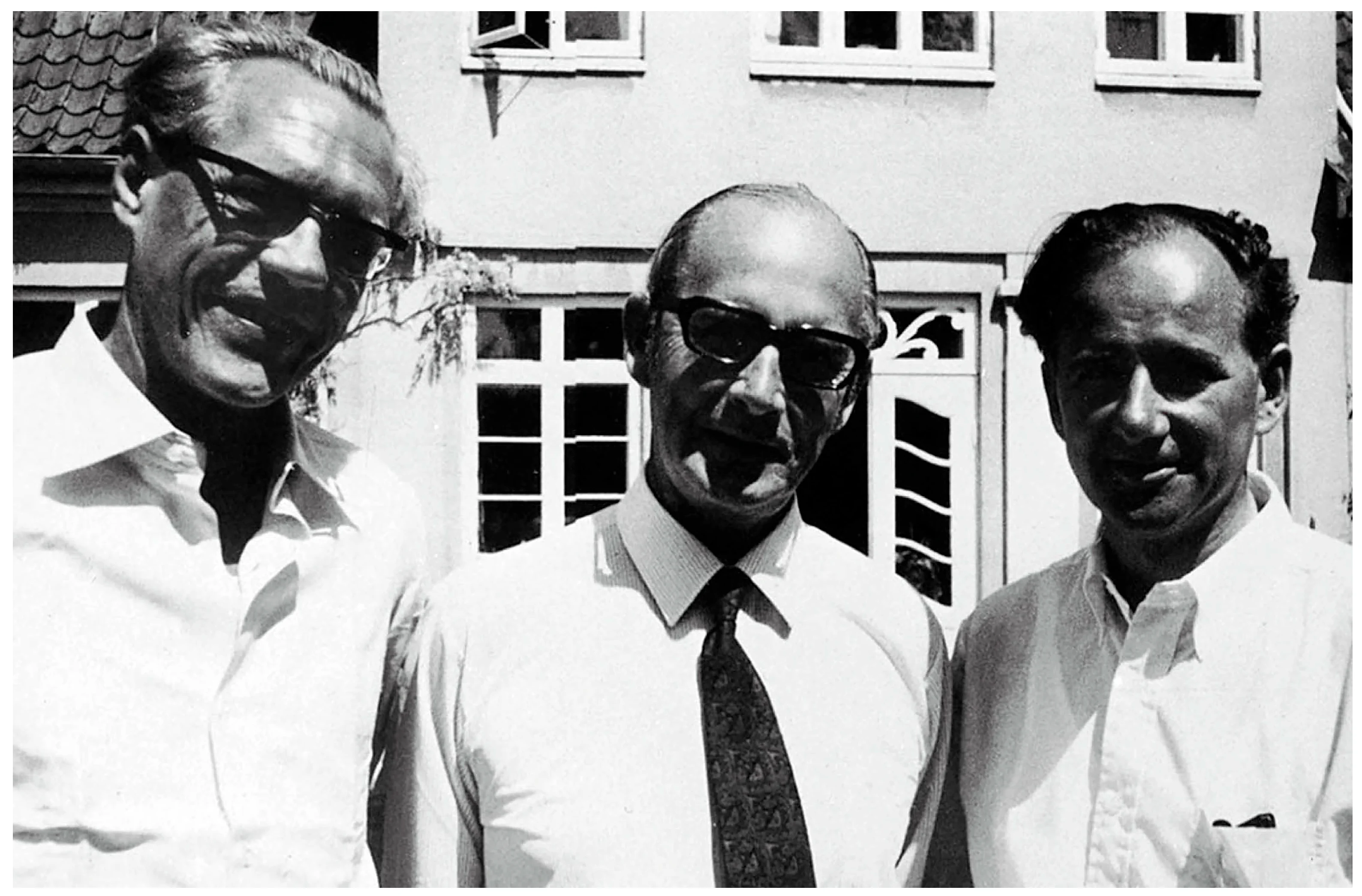
- Poul Baastrup, John Cade, and Mogens Schou
- Born: 24 November 1918; Copenhagen, Denmark
- Died: 29 September 2005 (aged 86)
- Education: University of Copenhagen (MD)
- Occupation: Psychiatrist
- Employer: Aarhus University
- Known for: Scientific research of lithium
- Awards: Honorary President, International Society for Bipolar Disorders

Mogens Schou (24 November 1918 – 29 September 2005) was a Danish psychiatrist whose research into lithium led to its utilization as a treatment for bipolar disorder.

== Early years ==
Schou was born in Copenhagen, Denmark, on 24 November 1918. His father was a psychiatrist and medical director of a large mental hospital. Schou chose to study medicine with a specific view to doing research on manic-depressive illness (now more commonly referred to as bipolar disorder). He graduated with a degree in medicine from the University of Copenhagen in 1944. After his training in clinical psychiatry he also studied experimental biology.

== Research ==
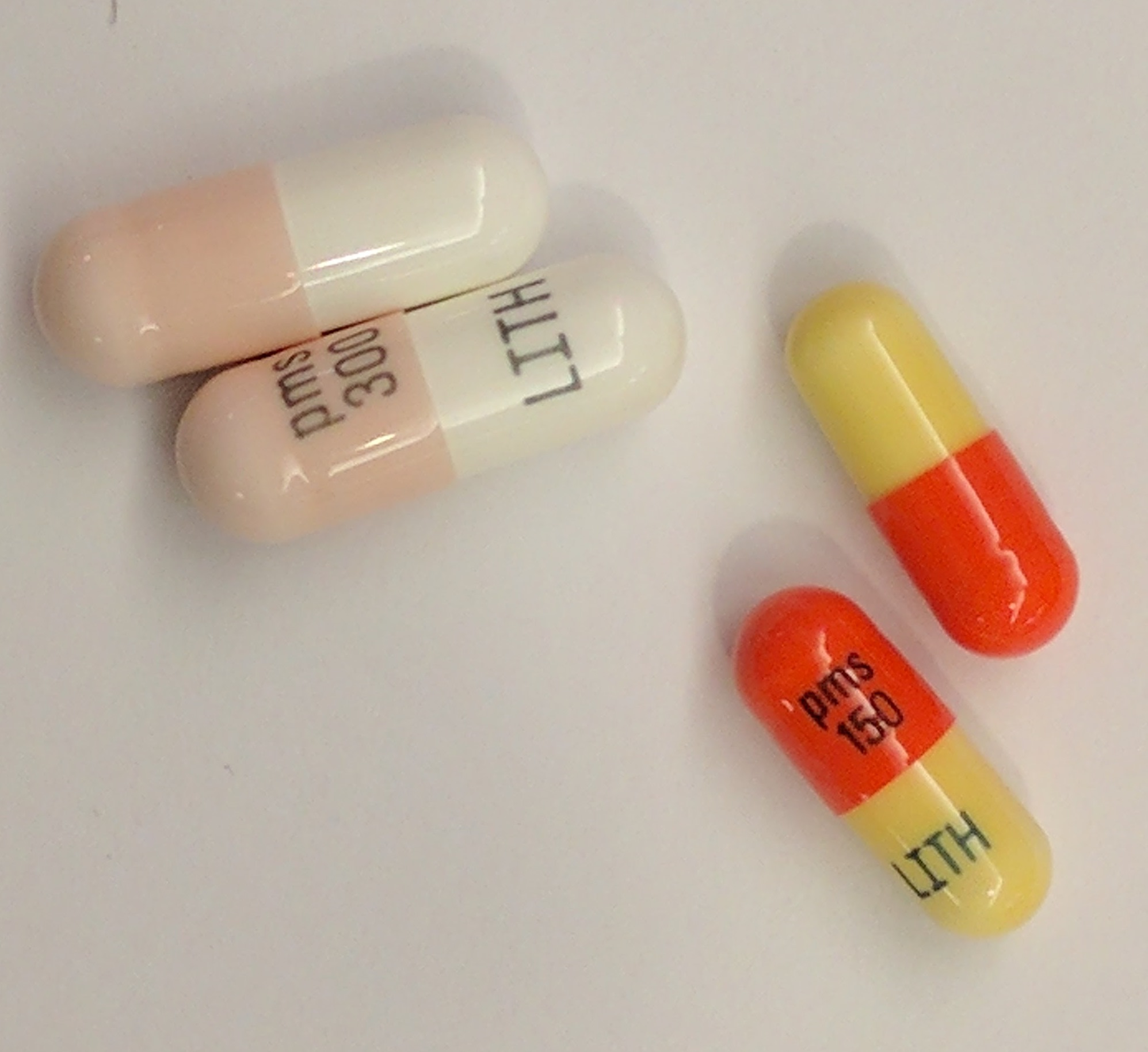
Schou spent his life researching lithium as a treatment for mental illness

Schou's research interests focused on therapeutic uses of lithium for patients with mood disorders.

The psychopharmacological era began in earnest in 1949, with an article published by John Cade about the observed antimanic action of lithium in Australia. Intrigued by these findings Schou, who in the meantime had joined the Psychiatric Research Institute of Aarhus University, confirmed these findings in a double-blind placebo-controlled study with his co-workers in 1954.

In a paper published in 1963, Mogens Schou introduced the term 'mood normalizer' or 'normothymotics' to categorize lithium, as it prevented episodes of depression or mania in bipolar disorder rather than just treating symptoms. Schou's younger brother suffered recurrent depressions that improved with lithium.

During the early 1960s, G. P. Hartigan, Poul Chr. Baastrup and Schou independently made sporadic observations that were suggestive of lithium also having prophylactic properties in manic-depressive illness. Subsequently, Baastrup and Schou joined and in a non-blind lithium trial saw their preliminary observations confirmed. They even deemed the results so significant that they concluded that 'lithium is the first drug demonstrated as a clear-cut prophylactic agent against one of the major psychoses'.

However, the Schou-Baastrup prophylaxis hypothesis was met with great resistance by British psychiatry. To Aubrey Lewis and Michael Shepherd, lithium was 'dangerous nonsense'. Shepherd, seconded by Harry Blackwell, simply characterized it as 'a therapeutic myth', which, in their opinion, was based on 'serious methodological shortcomings' and 'spurious claims'. Even terms such as unethical and unscientific were used.

After consideration of the ethical aspects invoked, Schou and Baastrup undertook a double-blind trial of prospective-discontinuation design and with random allocation of manic-depressive patients (already on lithium) to lithium or placebo. It confirmed their hypothesis, published in The Lancet in 1970.

Schou was aware of some of the limitations of lithium treatment. He welcomed the introduction of other prophylactic agents into the market. From the available observations he concluded, however, that anti-epileptics and atypical anti-psychotics act on different kinds of bipolar patients to lithium.

In 1988, Schou co-founded and was president of the International Group of Studies on Lithium Treated Patients (IGSLi). The group linked seven centers with clinical research programs on lithium.

Before his death, Schou was concerned with three main tasks related to the further development of lithium. He called these tasks his 'Swan Song.' He was concerned with use of lithium in recurrent unipolar depressions for those with 'hidden' bipolar disorder, the use of lithium for its anti-suicidal properties, and the prevalence of lithium use for the prevention of episodes in bipolar disorder and recurrent depressions.

He was an author of more than 500 publications, including texts, research papers, articles and book chapters. He was Emeritus Professor of the Psychiatric Hospital in Risskov, Denmark.

== Awards and honors ==
Schou has published approximately 540 works on lithium and lithium therapy, and some of his awards include:

- 1974—International Kittay Scientific Foundation Award (shared with Cade).
- 1982—John Cade Memorial Award.
- 1987—Albert Lasker Clinical Medical Research Award.
- 1995—International Society of Lithium Research's Mogens Schou Prize for Lifetime Achievement.
- 2000—C.I.N.P's Pioneers in Psychopharmacology Award.
- 2001—International Society For Bipolar Disorders Mogens Schou Award For Distinguished Contributions.
- 2004—NARSAD Lifetime Achievement Award.

He has received an honorary doctorate from Charles University in Prague. In recognition of his accomplishments in bipolar medicine, he was made the Honorary President of the International Society for Bipolar Disorders. At the same time, the Mogens Schou awards were created for presentation at the Society's biennial International Conference on Bipolar Disorder. He was twice nominated for the Nobel Prize in Physiology or Medicine.

== See also ==
- Lithium (medication)
- John Cade
