= John Cade =

Australian psychiatrist (1912–1980)

John Cade AO
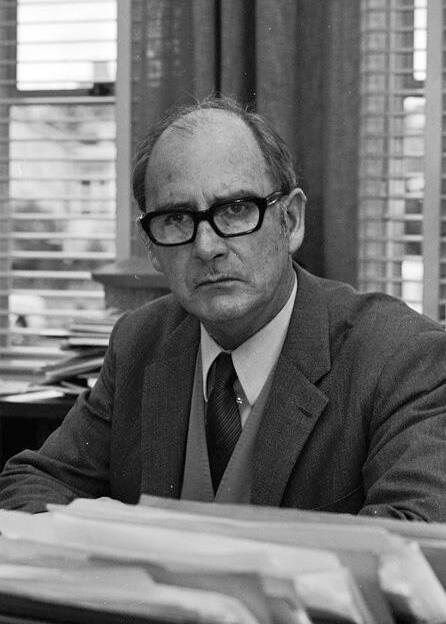
- Cade in 1971
- Born: 18 January 1912; Murtoa, Victoria, Australia
- Died: 16 November 1980 (aged 68); Fitzroy, Victoria, Australia
- Occupations: Psychiatrist, army medical officer, medical scientist, prisoner of war (Australian), public servant
- Known for: Discovery of lithium as a mood stabilizer
- Spouse: Estana Evelyn Jean Charles
- Children: John (1938), David (1940), Mary (1947), Peter (1948), Richard (1950)
- Parent(s): Dr David & Ellen Cade

John Frederick Joseph Cade AO (18 January 1912 – 16 November 1980) was an Australian psychiatrist who in 1948 discovered the effects of lithium as a mood stabilizer in the treatment of bipolar disorder, then known as manic depression. At a time when the standard treatments for mania were electroconvulsive therapy and lobotomy, lithium had the distinction of being the first effective medication available to treat a mental illness. Cade's discovery in 1948 began a revolution in psychopharmacology.

== Early life ==
John Cade was born in Murtoa, (Note: Some authors state Cade was born in Horsham, one of the larger towns in the Wimmera area. However other authors, notably Cade's son Jack Cade, state John Cade was born in Murtoa, a town 32 kilometres (20 mi) NE of Horsham.) in the Wimmera region of Victoria, Australia. John's father David was Murtoa's general practitioner. Ellen, John's mother, and younger brothers David and Frank completed the family. When John was a small boy, his father left for World War I and served in Gallipoli and France. On return from the war, his father suffered from 'war-weariness' and had difficulty in continuing in general practice. Therefore, his father sold the practice and accepted a position with the Mental Hygiene Department.

Over the next 25 years, Dr Cade Sr became medical superintendent at several Victorian mental hospitals, namely Sunbury, Beechworth and Mont Park. John and his brothers spent many of their younger years living within the grounds of these institutions, which had a great bearing on John's later deep understanding of the needs of the mentally ill. John was educated at Scotch College, Melbourne, matriculating in 1928. He then studied medicine at the University of Melbourne, graduating at the age of 21 years with honours in all subjects. He became a House Officer at St Vincent's Hospital and then Royal Children's Hospital before becoming severely ill with bilateral pneumococcal pneumonia. While he was convalescing, John fell in love with one of his nurses, Jean. They married in 1937.

=== World War II ===
Like his father before him, Cade left his young family to fight for Australia in the Armed Forces in World War II. Cade was appointed captain, Australian Army Medical Corps, A.I.F., on 1 July 1940 and posted to the 2nd/9th Field Ambulance. Although trained as a psychiatrist, Dr. Cade served as a surgeon and departed for Singapore in 1941 on RMS Queen Mary. He was promoted to major in September 1941. After the Fall of Singapore to Japan, he became a prisoner of war at Changi Prison from February 1942 to September 1945. During his imprisonment, he reportedly would observe some fellow inmates having strange, vacillating behaviour. He thought perhaps a toxin was affecting their brains and when it was eliminated through their urine, they lost their symptoms.

== Discovery of the effect of lithium on mania ==
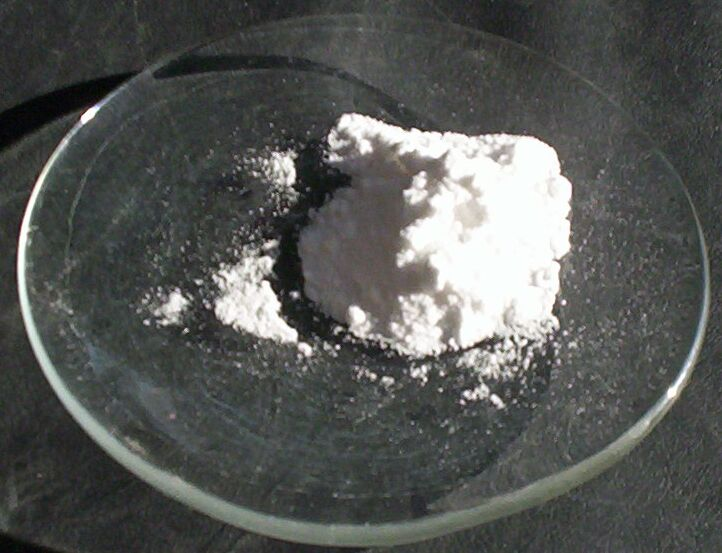
Cade discovered the effect of Lithium on mania

After the war, Cade recuperated very briefly in Heidelberg Hospital, then took up a position at Bundoora Repatriation Mental Hospital in Melbourne. It was at an unused pantry in Bundoora that he conducted crude experiments which led to the discovery of lithium as a treatment of bipolar disorder. Since he had no sophisticated analytical equipment these experiments mostly consisted of injecting urine from mentally ill patients into the abdomen of guinea pigs.

His early experiments suggested to him that the urine from manic patients was more toxic. There are 2 toxic substances in urine: urea and uric acid. He found urea was the same in both ill and healthy people. He started to work on uric acid. In order to do that, he made artificial solutions of uric acid. To make up different strengths of uric acid he needed to convert it into a substance that he could more easily manipulate. On its own uric acid would not dissolve in water. Then, in an effort to increase the water solubility of uric acid, lithium was added to make a solution of lithium urate.

Cade found that in the guinea pigs injected with lithium carbonate solution, as a control solution, the guinea pigs were more restful. His use of careful controls in his experiments revealed that the lithium-ion had a calming effect by itself, but even this finding may have been caused by the toxic effects of an excessive dose of lithium.

After ingesting lithium himself to ensure its safety in humans, Cade began a small-scale trial of lithium citrate and/or lithium carbonate on some of his patients diagnosed with mania, dementia præcox or melancholia, with outstanding results. The calming effect was so robust that Cade speculated that mania was caused by a deficiency in lithium. He published these findings in the Medical Journal of Australia in a paper entitled 'Lithium salts in the treatment of psychotic excitement', published in 1949.

While Cade's results appeared highly promising, the side effects of lithium in some cases led to non-compliance. The toxicity of lithium led to several deaths of patients undergoing lithium treatment. Of the first patients Cade treated with lithium, one died of lithium toxicity. Afterward, Cade stopped using lithium in his patients and stopped his research of the element.

However, other scientists had already read his 1949 article and continued their research of the effect of lithium on mania. Among them, Mogens Schou and Poul Baastrup of Denmark conducted a new trial and published their results in 1954. Schou and Baastrup would later prove instrumental in picking up where Cade left off.

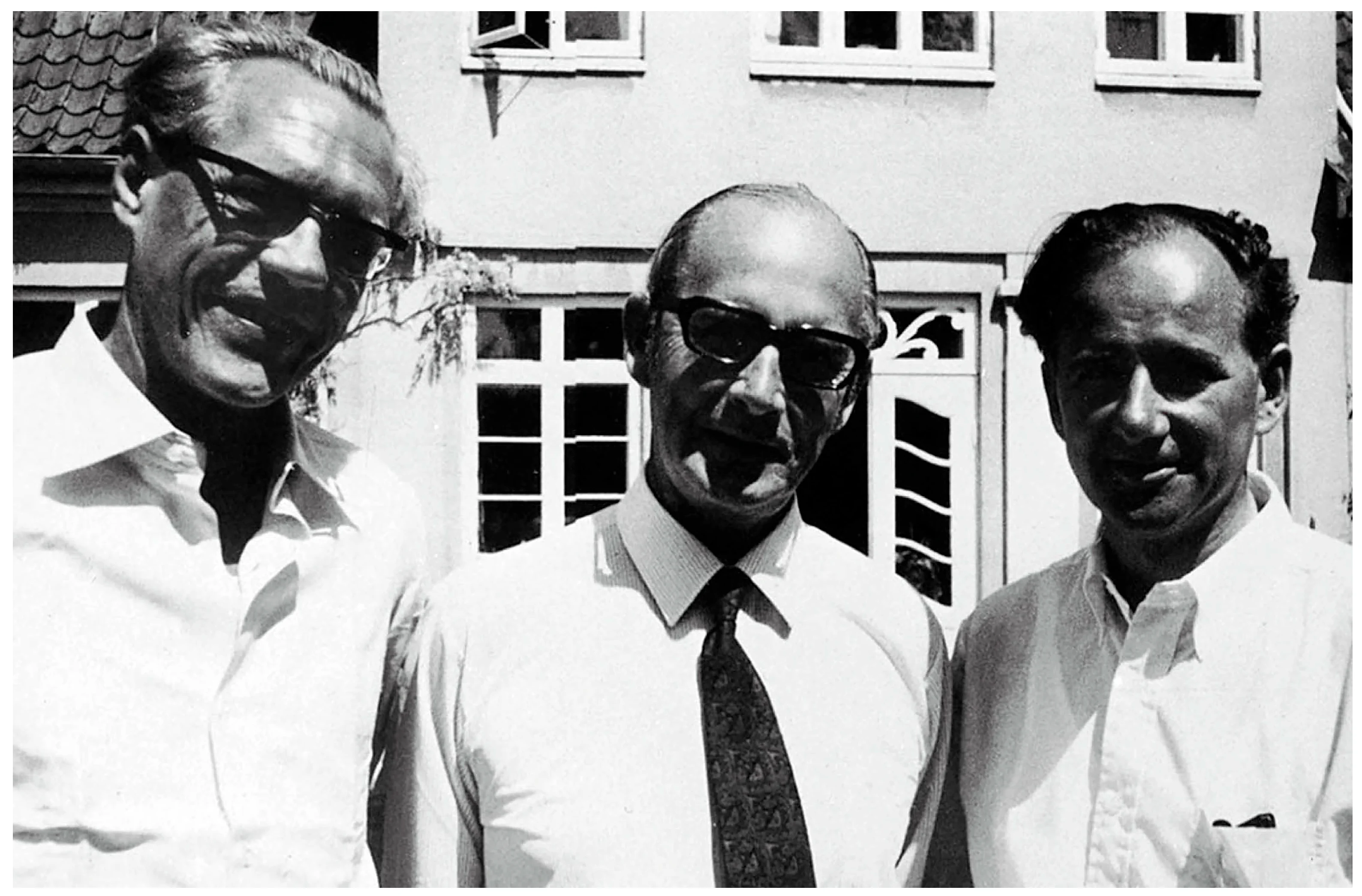
Poul Baastrup, John Cade, and Mogens Schou

Cade continued researching mania, as well as the effect of other elements. He followed the developing research on lithium closely, but had abandoned its further research due to the initial patient death. After Cade's original hypothesis was proven correct by other scientists, Cade was recognized with a variety of awards and honors for the discovery of lithium's effect on mania and the prophylaxis of mania.

There were several obstacles that hindered lithium's development. The problem of toxicity was greatly reduced when suitable tests were developed to measure the lithium level in the blood. The advent of the Beckman flame photometer allowed doctors to measure lithium levels more accurately to keep them within the tolerable range. Moreover, as a naturally occurring chemical, lithium salt could not be patented, meaning that its manufacturing and sales were not considered commercially viable. These factors prevented its widespread adoption in psychiatry for some years, particularly in the United States. Due to the efforts of Cade's colleagues in academia, lithium was finally approved by the US Food and Drug Administration in 1970.

== Royal Park and RANZCP ==
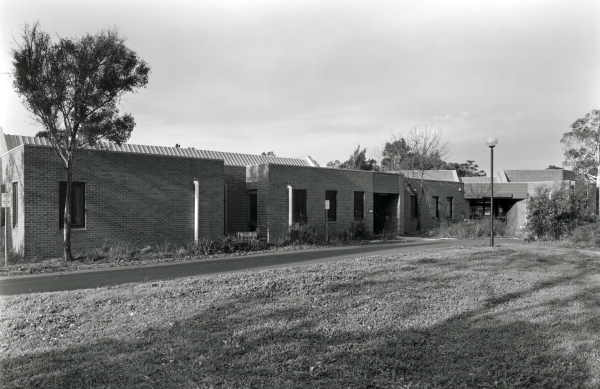
John Cade acute unit at Royal Park Hospital circa 2003

In 1952 Cade was appointed Superintendent and Dean of the clinical school at Royal Park Hospital. Two years later, at the request of the Mental Hygiene Authority which was planning to remodel Royal Park, he visited Britain for six months to inspect psychiatric institutions. On his return, he introduced modern facilities and replaced the rather authoritarian approach to patient care with a lot more personal and informal style that included group therapy. Concerned at the number of alcohol-related cases, he supported voluntary admission to aid early detection and later proposed the use of large doses of thiamine in the treatment of alcoholism. Cade served as the Superintendent at Royal Park until his retirement in 1977.

He served as the federal president of the Royal Australian and New Zealand College of Psychiatrists in 1969–70, and also as the president for its Victoria branch from 1963 until his death in 1980. In the end, Dr. Cade's discovery did receive widespread acknowledgements and praise. For his contribution to psychiatry, he was awarded a Kittay International Award in 1974 (with Mogens Schou from Denmark), and he was invited to be a Distinguished Fellow of the American College of Psychiatrists. In 1976, Cade was one of the first to be made an Officer of the Order of Australia.

Dr. Cade remained humble about his chance discovery, describing himself as merely a gold prospector who happened to find a nugget. Finally, in July 2004, the Medical Journal of Australia reported that Cade's 1949 article, "Lithium salts in the treatment of psychotic excitement", was the number one most cited MJA article.

== Legacy ==
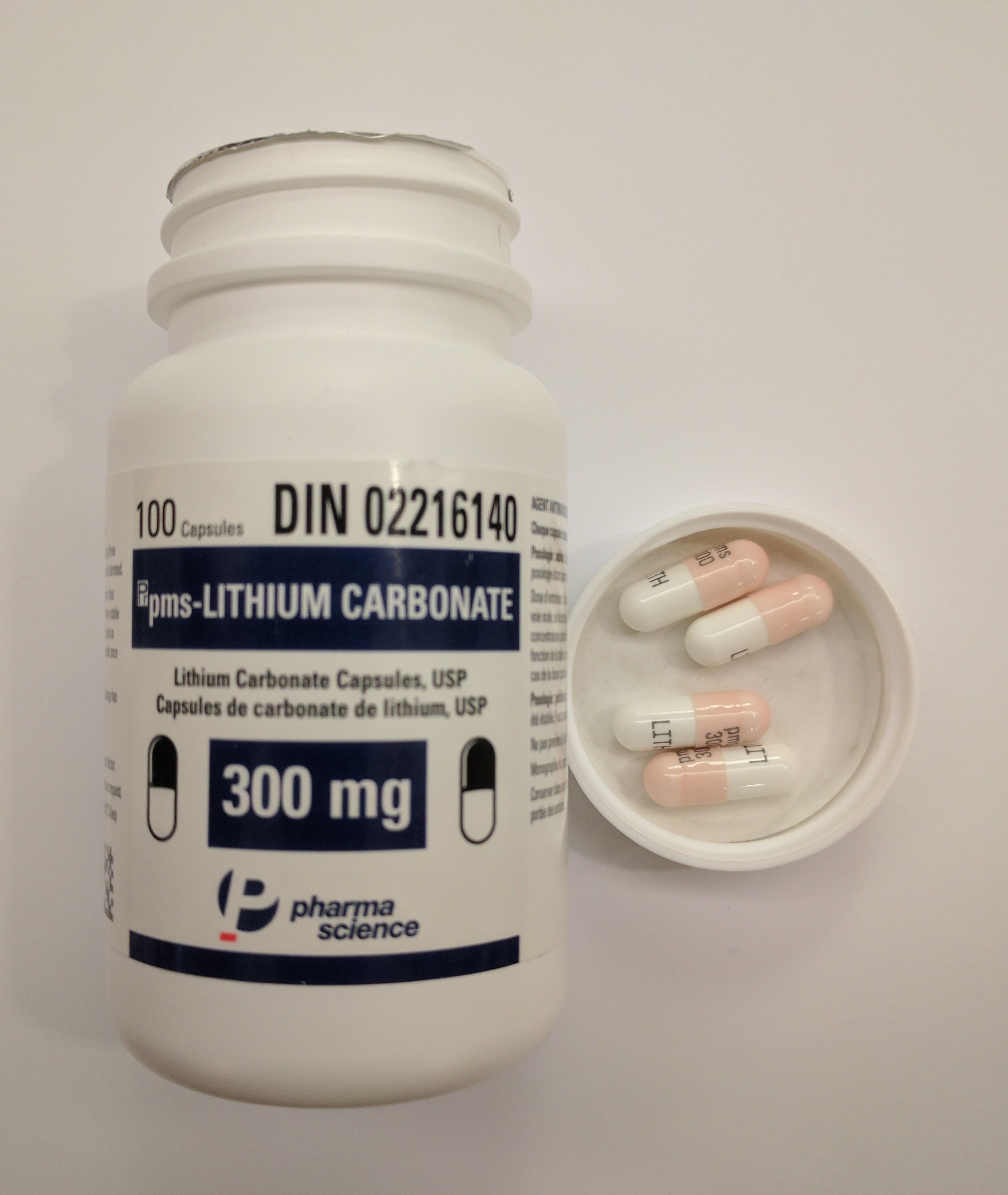
During Cade's lifetime, lithium came into widespread use as a medicine

John Cade died of oesophageal cancer at Fitzroy on 16 November 1980, and is buried at Yan Yean Cemetery in Whittlesea. Recognition of Cade's pioneering work continued after his death. The Adult Acute unit at Royal Park Hospital was named the "John Cade Unit" in recognition of Cade's long service to the hospital. After Royal Park's closure, the newly opened Adult Acute Psychiatric Unit at Royal Melbourne Hospital was named "John Cade Adult Acute Inpatient Unit".

In 1980 the first John Cade memorial lecture was delivered by Mogens Schou at the congress in Jerusalem of the Collegian International Psychopharmacologium. In 2013 the National Health and Medical Research Council (NHMRC) offered two $750 000 per annum fellowships for mental health research, entitled the "NHMRC John Cade Fellowship in Mental Health Research". The Fellowship recipients were Professor Helen Christensen of the University of New South Wales and Professor John McGrath of The University of Queensland. The RANZCP awards The John Cade Memorial Medal to a final year Victorian medical student following a special clinical examination at Monash University or the University of Melbourne each year. The Faculty of Medicine at University of Melbourne also awards the John Cade Memorial Prize.

== Troubled Minds ==
In 2004, Film Australia and SBS screened the documentary Troubled Minds – The Lithium Revolution, a 60-minute documentary portraying John Cade's discovery of the use of Lithium in mental illness. The documentary received international recognition, winning the main prize at the International Vega Awards for Excellence in Scientific Broadcasting. Troubled Minds was also recognised locally with writer/director Dennis K. Smith winning the AWGIE Award for Best Documentary.

== See also ==
- Lithium (medication)
- Mogens Schou
