= Simple-type schizophrenia =

- Other names: Simple schizophrenia, simple deteriorative disorder, schizophrenia simplex, deficit schizophrenia, deficit syndrome
- Specialty: Psychiatry

Simple-type schizophrenia is a sub-type of schizophrenia included in the International Classification of Diseases (ICD-10), in which it is classified as a mental and behaviour disorder. It is not included in the current Diagnostic and Statistical Manual of Mental Disorders (DSM-5) or the ICD-11. Simple-type schizophrenia is characterized by negative ("deficit") symptoms, such as avolition, apathy, anhedonia, reduced affect display, lack of initiative, lack of motivation, low activity; with absence of hallucinations or delusions of any kind.

Simple schizophrenia was included as a proposed diagnosis for further study in the appendix of the former DSM-IV.

== Signs and symptoms ==
It has possibly the earliest onset compared to all other schizophrenias, considered to begin in some within childhood. Symptoms of schizophrenia simplex include an absence of will, impoverished thinking and flattening of affect. There is a gradual deterioration of functioning with increased amotivation and reduced socialization. It is considered to be rarely diagnosed and is a schizophrenia without psychotic symptoms.

In a study of patients in a Massachusetts hospital, persons with simple schizophrenia were found to make attempts at reality fulfillment with respect to the more primitive needs; tending toward the achievement of fulfillment of these needs rather than engaging in fantasy as is typically found as a reaction to environmental stimuli by the psychotic person.

== Causes ==
A progressive state of simple schizophrenia results often in cases of adolescent onset juvenile general paresis. Paresis is caused by placental-foetal transfer of infection and results in intellectual (mental) subnormality. Occurrence of this type of paresis is altogether uncommon (Lishman 1998).

== Diagnosis ==
=== Classification ===
==== ICD ====
The WHO first listed the condition in the 6th revision of the International Classification of Diseases ICD-6 (1949) and it stayed in the manual until ICD-10.

===== ICD-9 =====
The ICD-9 simple-type schizophrenia description:

A psychosis in which there is insidious development of oddities of conduct, inability to meet the demands of society, and decline in total performance. Delusions and hallucinations are not in evidence and the condition is less obviously psychotic than are the hebephrenic, catatonic and paranoid types of schizophrenia. With increasing social impoverishment vagrancy may ensue and the patient becomes self-absorbed, idle and aimless. Because the schizophrenic symptoms are not clear-cut, diagnosis of this form should be made sparingly, if at all.

— ICD-9 (1977). Schizophrenic psychoses: 295.0 Simple type.

===== ICD-10 =====
These are the criteria:

Slowly progressive development over a period of at least one year, of all three of the following:

(a) A significant and consistent change in the overall quality of some aspects of personal behaviour, manifest as loss of drive and interests, aimlessness, idleness, a self-absorbed attitude and social withdrawal.

(b) Gradual appearance and deepening of negative symptoms such as marked apathy, paucity of speech, underactivity, blunting of affect, passivity and lack of initiative, and poor non-verbal communication.

(c) Marked decline in social, scholastic or occupational performance.

2. Absence, at any time, of any symptoms referred to in G1 in F20.0 - F20.3 and of hallucinations or well formed delusions of any kind, i.e. the subject must never have met the criteria for any other type of schizophrenia, or any other psychotic disorder.

3. Absence of evidence of dementia or any other organic mental disorder.

— Simple schizophrenia (F20.6), ICD-10.

ICD-11 was accepted in May 2019 and came into effect in 2022. In the ICD-11, there is no longer a diagnostic category of simple schizophrenia, and all subtypes of schizophrenia have been eliminated.

==== DSM ====
Simple-type schizophrenia also appeared in the first two editions of the DSM as an official diagnosis:

This psychosis is characterized chiefly by a slow and insidious reduction of external attachments and interests and by apathy and indifference leading to impoverishment of interpersonal relations, mental deterioration, and adjustment on a lower level of functioning. In general, the condition is less dramatically psychotic than are the hebephrenic, catatonic, and paranoid types of schizophrenia. Also, it contrasts with schizoid personality, in which there is little or no progression of the disorder.

— 295.0 Schizophrenia, simple type. DSM-II (1968).

But after that, it was omitted in later versions and has since then never returned as a formal diagnosis in any DSM. However, DSM-IV (1994) and DSM-IV-TR (2000) included Simple Schizophrenia in the appendix under the proposed category of simple deteriorative disorder. The provisional research criteria for it were:

Progressive development over a period of at least a year of all of the following:

(1) marked decline in occupational or academic functioning

(2) gradual appearance and deepening of negative symptoms such as affective flattening, alogia, and avolition

(3) poor interpersonal rapport, social isolation or social withdrawal

B. Criterion A for Schizophrenia has never been met.

C. The symptoms are not better accounted for by Schizotypal or Schizoid Personality Disorder, a Psychotic Disorder, a Mood Disorder, an Anxiety Disorder, a dementia, or Mental Retardation and are not due to the direct physiological effects of a substance or a general medical condition.

— DSM-IV-TR. Appendix B: Criteria Sets and Axes Provided for Further Study.

== Treatment ==
The use of antipsychotic medication is commonly the first line of treatment; however, the effectiveness after treatment is in question.

L-DOPA is effective against reduced affect display and emotional withdrawal, aloofness from society, apathy.

== History ==
The early idea that a person with schizophrenia might present solely with symptoms and indications of deterioration (i.e. presenting with no accessory symptoms) was identified as dementia simplex.

ICD-10 specifies the continuation of symptoms for a period of two years in the diagnosis of simple schizophrenia. This is because of disagreement on the classification validity of the sub-type, that having been retained by the ICD classification, has been omitted from DSM classifications. Symptoms identified earlier to dementia simplex are now DSM-attributed by way of improvements in diagnostic technique to other classifications such as neurodegenerative disorders.

Early observations that concur with symptoms of the dementia praecox of the form classified later as simplex began in 1838 with Jean Esquirol. In 1860, Bénédict Morel introduced the term dementia précoce and Langdon Down provided in 1887 the most complete description to that date of the clinical manifestation that Charpentier described in 1890 as dementia précoce simple des enfant normaux.

The description of simple schizophrenia is inter-changeable with describing symptoms as a form of dementia praecox known as simple dementing, at least in the time when the Swiss psychiatrists Otto Diem and Eugen Bleuler were studying it. In 1893, Emil Kraepelin considered there were four types of schizophrenia, and was amongst the first to identify three of them (dementia hebephrenica, dementia paranoides, dementia catatonica). The simplex type was added by Eugen Bleuler to the earlier ones identified by Kraepelin in 1899 and subsequently given a basic outline in 1903 by Otto Diem publishing a monograph on dementia praecox in the simple dementing form. This was based on a survey of two males having had a relatively normal childhood but who then fell into patterns of living tending towards vagrancy.

A description of a cerebral disorder in relation to organic factors and in the context of general paralysis of the insane only; with no reference to schizophrenia, shows a disorder with features of generalized dementia (Lishman 1998). In 1951, a film was made showing the clinical characteristics of simple-type schizophrenia.

== Controversy ==
Definition of this type of schizophrenia is without unity or is controversial. The diagnosis was discontinued in the DSM system, although it was recommended for reinclusion in 1989. It was subsequently confirmed as having imprecise diagnostic criteria based on collective descriptions lacking in agreement.

However, in an experiment with a small sample size, five patients with a diagnosis of simple deteriorative disorder (DSM-IV) were found to have grey matter deficits, atrophy and reduced cerebral perfusion in the frontal areas. Whitwell et al. found justification to retain the classification on the basis of fulfillment of "dimensional" considerations of classification, as opposed to criticisms resulting from disagreement in considerations of classification using orientation from other categories.

== See also ==
- Anhedonia
