= Schizoaffective disorder =

Mental disorder

- Specialty: Psychiatry
- Symptoms: Hallucinations; delusions; disorganized thought and behavior; inappropriate affect; depression; mania
- Usual onset: 16–30 years of age
- Types: Bipolar type; depressive type; mixed type (includes both depressive and bipolar symptoms)
- Causes: Unknown
- Risk factors: Genetics; brain chemistry and structure; stress; drug use
- Diagnostic method: Psychiatric assessment
- Differential diagnosis: Psychotic depression; bipolar disorder with psychotic features; schizophreniform disorder; schizophrenia
- Medication: Antipsychotics; mood stabilizers; antidepressants
- Prognosis: Depends on the individual, medication response, and therapeutic support available
- Frequency: 0.3%

Schizoaffective disorder is a mental disorder where symptoms of both schizophrenia (psychosis) and a mood disorder, either bipolar disorder or depression, co-occur. The main diagnostic criterion is the presence of psychotic symptoms for at least two weeks without prominent mood symptoms.

Common symptoms include hallucinations, delusions, disorganized speech and thinking, as well as mood episodes. Schizoaffective disorder can often be misdiagnosed when the correct diagnosis may be psychotic depression, bipolar I disorder, schizophreniform disorder, or schizophrenia. This is a problem as treatment and prognosis differ greatly for most of these diagnoses. Many people with schizoaffective disorder have other mental disorders, including anxiety disorders.

There are three forms of schizoaffective disorder: bipolar or manic type (marked by symptoms of schizophrenia and mania), depressive type (marked by symptoms of schizophrenia and depression), and mixed type (marked by symptoms of schizophrenia, depression, and mania). Auditory hallucinations are the most common type. The onset of symptoms usually begins in adolescence or young adulthood.

Genetics (researched in the field of genomics); problems with neural circuits; chronic early and chronic or short-term current environmental stress appear to be important causal factors. No single organic cause has been isolated, but extensive evidence exists for abnormalities in the metabolism of tetrahydrobiopterin (BH4), dopamine, and glutamic acid in people with schizophrenia, psychotic mood disorders, and schizoaffective disorder.

While a diagnosis of schizoaffective disorder is rare (0.3% of the general American population), it is considered a common diagnosis among psychiatric disorders. Diagnosis of schizoaffective disorder is based on DSM-5 criteria, which consist principally of the presence of symptoms of schizophrenia, mania, and depression, and the temporal relationships between them.

The main current treatment is antipsychotic medication combined with either mood stabilizers or antidepressants (or both). There is growing concern by some researchers that antidepressants may increase psychosis, mania, and long-term mood episode cycling in the disorder. When there is risk to self or others, usually early in treatment, psychiatric hospitalization may be necessary. Psychiatric rehabilitation, psychotherapy, and vocational rehabilitation are very important for recovery of higher psychosocial function.

As a group, people diagnosed with schizoaffective disorder using DSM-IV and ICD-10 criteria (now ICD-11) have a better prognosis, but they have variable individual psychosocial functional outcomes compared to people with mood disorders (from worse to the same). Outcomes for people with DSM-5-diagnosed schizoaffective disorder depend on data from prospective cohort studies, which have not been completed. The DSM-5 updated the diagnostic criteria from the DSM-IV because the latter led to overdiagnosis. (That is, DSM-IV criteria led to many patients being misdiagnosed with the disorder.) DSM-IV prevalence estimates were less than one percent of the population (in the range of 0.5–0.8%); newer DSM-5 prevalence estimates are not yet available.

== Signs and symptoms ==
Schizoaffective disorder is defined by mood disorder-free psychosis in the context of a long-term psychotic and mood disorder. Psychosis must meet criterion A for schizophrenia which may include delusions, hallucinations, disorganized speech and behavior and negative symptoms.

Both delusions and hallucinations are classic symptoms of psychosis. Delusions are false beliefs which are strongly held despite evidence to the contrary. Beliefs should not be considered delusional if they are in keeping with cultural beliefs. Delusional beliefs may or may not reflect mood symptoms (for example, someone experiencing depression may or may not experience delusions of guilt). Hallucinations are disturbances in perception involving any of the five senses, although auditory hallucinations (or "hearing voices") are the most common. Negative symptoms include alogia (lack of speech), blunted affect (reduced intensity of outward emotional expression), avolition (lack of motivation), and anhedonia (inability to experience pleasure). Negative symptoms can be more lasting and more debilitating than positive symptoms of psychosis.

Mood symptoms include mania, hypomania, mixed episode, or depression, and tend to be episodic rather than continuous. A mixed episode represents a combination of symptoms of mania and depression at the same time. Symptoms of mania include elevated or irritable mood, grandiosity (inflated self-esteem), agitation, risk-taking behavior, decreased need for sleep, poor concentration, rapid speech, and racing thoughts. Symptoms of depression include low mood, apathy, changes in appetite or weight, disturbances in sleep, changes in motor activity, fatigue, guilt or feelings of worthlessness, and suicidal thinking.

DSM-5 states that if a patient only experiences psychotic symptoms during a mood episode, their diagnosis is mood disorder with psychotic features and not schizophrenia or schizoaffective disorder. If the patient experiences psychotic symptoms without mood symptoms for longer than a two-week period, their diagnosis is either schizophrenia or schizoaffective disorder. If mood disorder episodes are present for the majority and residual course of the illness and up until the diagnosis, the patient can be diagnosed with schizoaffective disorder.

== Causes ==
A combination of genetic and environmental factors is believed to play a role in the development of schizoaffective disorder.

Genetic studies do not support the view that schizophrenia, psychotic mood disorders and schizoaffective disorder are distinct etiological entities, but rather the evidence suggests the existence of common inherited vulnerability that increases the risks for all these syndromes. Some susceptibility pathways may be specific for schizophrenia, others for bipolar disorder, and yet other mechanisms and genes may confer risk for mixed schizophrenic and affective [or mood disorder] psychoses, but there is no support from genetics for the view that these are distinct disorders with distinct etiologies and pathogenesis. Laboratory studies of putative endophenotypes, brain imaging studies, and post mortem studies shed little additional light on the validity of the schizoaffective disorder diagnosis, as most studies combine subjects with different chronic psychoses in comparison to healthy subjects.

— According to William T. Carpenter, the head of the University of Maryland, Baltimore School of Medicine DSM-5 psychotic disorders workgroup, and others.

Viewed broadly, then, biological and environmental factors interact with a person's genes in ways that may increase or decrease the risk for developing schizoaffective disorder; exactly how this happens (the biological mechanism) is not yet known. Schizophrenia spectrum disorders, of which schizoaffective disorder is a part, have been increasingly linked to advanced paternal age at the time of conception, a known cause of genetic mutations. The physiology of people diagnosed with schizoaffective disorder appears to be similar, but not identical, to that of those diagnosed with schizophrenia and bipolar disorder; however, human neurophysiological function in normal brain and mental disorder syndromes is not fully understood.

While there are various medications and treatment options for those with schizoaffective disorder, this disorder can affect a person for their entire lifespan. In some cases, this disorder can affect a person's ability to have a fulfilling social life, and they may also have trouble forming bonds or relationships with others. Schizoaffective disorder is also more likely to occur in women and begins at a young age.

=== Substance use disorder ===
A clear causal connection between substance use and psychotic spectrum disorders, including schizoaffective disorder, has been difficult to prove. In the specific case of cannabis (marijuana), however, evidence supports a link between earlier onset of psychotic illness and cannabis use. The more often cannabis is used, particularly in early adolescence, the more likely a person is to develop a psychotic illness, with frequent use being correlated with double the risk of psychosis and schizoaffective disorder. A 2009 Yale review stated that in individuals with an established psychotic disorder, cannabinoids can exacerbate symptoms, trigger relapse, and have negative consequences on the course of the illness.

While cannabis use is accepted as a contributory cause of schizoaffective disorder by many, it remains controversial, since not all young people who use cannabis later develop psychosis, but those who do use cannabis have an increased odds ratio of about 3. Certain drugs can imitate symptoms of schizophrenia (which is known to have similar symptoms to schizoaffective disorder). This is important to note when including that substance-induced psychosis should be ruled out when diagnosing patients, so that patients are not misdiagnosed.

== Mechanisms ==
Though the pathophysiology of schizoaffective disorder remains unclear, studies suggest that dopamine, norepinephrine, and serotonin may be factors in the development of the disorder. White matter and grey matter reductions in the right lentiform nucleus, left superior temporal gyrus, and right precuneus, and other areas in the brain are also characteristic of schizoaffective disorder. Deformities in white matter have also been found to worsen with time in individuals with schizoaffective disorder.

Due to its role in emotional regulation, researchers believe that the hippocampus is also involved in the progression of schizoaffective disorder. Specifically, psychotic disorders (such as schizoaffective disorder) have been associated with lower hippocampal volumes. Moreover, deformities in the medial and thalamic regions of the brain have been implicated as contributing factors to the disorder as well.

== Diagnosis ==
Psychosis as a symptom of a psychiatric disorder is first and foremost a diagnosis of exclusion. So, a new-onset episode of psychosis cannot be considered a symptom of a psychiatric disorder until other organic causes of psychosis are ruled out. Many clinicians improperly perform, or entirely miss, this step, introducing avoidable diagnostic error and misdiagnosis.

An initial assessment involves a thorough history-taking and physical examination. Although there are no objective laboratory tests available to diagnose schizoaffective disorder definitively, laboratory investigations should be conducted to rule out psychosis resulting from substance use, medications, toxins or poisons, surgical complications, or other organic conditions. Since non-medical mental health practitioners lack training to identify medical causes of psychosis, individuals experiencing such symptoms should be referred to an emergency department or hospital for further evaluation.

Delirium should be ruled out; it is characterized by visual hallucinations, an acute onset, and fluctuating levels of consciousness, suggesting other underlying factors, including medical illnesses. Excluding medical illnesses associated with psychosis is performed by using blood tests to measure:

- Thyroid-stimulating hormone to exclude hypo- or hyperthyroidism,
- Basic electrolytes and serum calcium to rule out a metabolic disturbance,
- Complete blood count, including ESR to rule out a systemic infection or chronic disease, and
- Serology to exclude syphilis or HIV infection.

Other investigations that may be performed include:

- EEG to exclude epilepsy, and an
- MRI or CT scan of the head to exclude brain lesions.

Blood tests are not usually repeated for relapse in people with an established diagnosis of schizoaffective disorder, unless there is a specific medical indication. These may include serum blood sugar, if olanzapine has previously been prescribed; thyroid function, if lithium has previously been taken to rule out hypothyroidism; liver function tests, if chlorpromazine has been prescribed; creatine kinase levels to exclude neuroleptic malignant syndrome; and a urinalysis and serum toxicology screening, if substance use is suspected. Assessment and treatment may be done on an outpatient basis; admission to an inpatient facility is considered if there is a risk to self or others.

Because psychosis may be precipitated or exacerbated by common classes of psychiatric medications, such as antidepressants, ADHD stimulant medications, and sleep medications, prescribed medication-induced psychosis should be ruled out, particularly for first-episode psychosis. This is an essential step to reduce diagnostic error and to evaluate potential medication sources of further patient harm. Regarding prescribed medication sources of patient harm, Yale School of Medicine Substance-induced psychosis should also be ruled out. Both substance- and medication-induced psychosis can be excluded to a high level of certainty while the person is psychotic, typically in an emergency department, using both a:

- Broad-spectrum urine toxicology screening, and a
- Full serum toxicology screening (of the blood).

Some dietary supplements may also induce psychosis or mania, but cannot be ruled out with laboratory tests. So a psychotic person's family, partner, or friends should be asked whether they are currently taking any dietary supplements.

Common mistakes made when diagnosing psychotic patients include:

- Not properly excluding delirium,
- Missing a toxic psychosis by not screening for substances and medications,
- Not appreciating medical abnormalities (e.g., vital signs),
- Not obtaining a medical history and family history,
- Indiscriminate screening without an organizing framework,
- Not asking family or others about dietary supplements,
- Premature diagnostic closure, and
- Not revisiting or questioning the initial diagnostic impression of primary psychiatric disorder.

Schizoaffective disorder can only be diagnosed among those who have undergone a clinical evaluation with a psychiatrist. The criterion includes mental and physical symptoms such as hallucinations or delusions, and depressive episodes. There are also links to bad hygiene and a troubled social life for those with schizoaffective disorder. Research has failed to conclusively demonstrate a positive relationship between schizoaffective disorder and substance abuse. There are several theorized causations for the onset of schizoaffective disorder, including genetics, general brain function, such as chemistry and structure, and stress.

Only after these relevant and known causes of psychosis have been ruled out can a psychiatric differential diagnosis be made. A mental health clinician will incorporate family history and observation of a psychotic person's behavior while the person is experiencing active symptoms to begin a psychiatric differential diagnosis. Diagnosis also includes self-reported experiences and behavioral abnormalities reported by family members, friends, or significant others. Mistakes in this stage include:

- Not screening for dissociative disorders. Dissociative identity disorder and psychotic symptoms in schizoaffective disorder have considerable overlap, yet a different overall treatment approach.

=== DSM-5 criteria ===
The most widely used criteria for diagnosing schizoaffective disorder are from the American Psychiatric Association's Diagnostic and Statistical Manual of Mental Disorders-5.

The DSM-IV schizoaffective disorder definition was plagued by problems of being inconsistently (or unreliably) used on patients; when the diagnosis is made, it does not stay with most patients over time, and it has questionable diagnostic validity (that is, it does not describe a distinct disorder, nor predict any particular outcome). These problems have been slightly reduced (or "modestly improved") in the DSM-5 according to Carpenter.

When psychotic symptoms are confined to an episode of mania or depression (with or without mixed features), the diagnosis is that of a "psychotic" mood disorder, namely either psychotic bipolar disorder or psychotic major depression. Only when psychotic states persist in a sustained fashion for two weeks or longer without concurrent affective symptoms is the diagnosis schizoaffective disorder, schizophreniform disorder or schizophrenia.

The second cardinal guideline in the DSM-5 diagnosis of schizoaffective disorder is one of timeframe. DSM-5 requires two episodes of psychosis (whereas DSM-IV needed only one) to qualify for the schizoaffective disorder diagnosis. As such, it is no longer an "episode diagnosis." The new schizoaffective framework looks at the time from "the [first episode of] psychosis up to the current episode [of psychosis], rather than only defining a single episode with [co-occurring] psychotic and mood syndromes." Specifically, one of the episodes of psychosis must last a minimum of two weeks without mood disorder symptoms, but the person may be mildly to moderately depressed while psychotic. The other period of psychosis "requires the overlap of mood [disorder] symptoms with psychotic symptoms to be conspicuous" and lasts for a greater portion of the disorder.

These two changes are intended by the DSM-5 workgroup to accomplish two goals:

- Increase the consistency (or reliability) of the diagnosis when it is used;
- Significantly decrease the overall use of the schizoaffective disorder diagnosis.

If the schizoaffective diagnosis is used less often, other diagnoses (like psychotic mood disorders and schizophrenia) are likely to be used more often, but this is hypothetical until real-world data arrive. Validity problems with the diagnosis remain and await further work in the fields of psychiatric genetics, neuroimaging, and cognitive science that includes the overlapping fields of cognitive, affective, and social neuroscience, which may change the way schizoaffective disorder is conceptualized and defined in future versions of the DSM and ICD.

==== Comorbidities ====
Schizoaffective disorder shares a high level of comorbidity with anxiety disorders, depression, and bipolar disorder. Individuals with schizoaffective disorder are also often diagnosed with substance abuse disorder, usually relating to tobacco, marijuana, or alcohol. Health care providers indicate the importance of assessing for co-occurring substance use disorders, as multiple diagnoses not only potentially increase negative symptomology, but may also adversely affect the treatment of schizoaffective disorder.

==== Types ====
One of three types of schizoaffective disorder may be noted in a diagnosis based on the mood component of the disorder:

- Bipolar type, when the disturbance includes manic episodes, hypomania, or mixed episodes—major depressive episodes also typically occur;
- Depressive type, when the disturbance includes major depressive episodes exclusively—that is, without manic, hypomanic, or mixed episodes.
- Mixed type, when the disturbance includes both manic and depressive symptoms, but psychotic symptoms exist separately from bipolar disorder.

==== Problems with DSM-IV schizoaffective disorder ====
The American Psychiatric Association's DSM-IV criteria for schizoaffective disorder persisted for 19 years (1994–2013). Clinicians adequately trained in diagnosis used the schizoaffective diagnosis too often, largely because the criteria were poorly defined, ambiguous, and hard to use (or poorly operationalized). Poorly trained clinicians used the diagnosis without making necessary exclusions of common causes of psychosis, including some prescribed psychiatric medications. Specialty books written by experts on schizoaffective disorder have existed for over eight years before DSM-5, describing the overuse of the diagnosis.

Carpenter and the DSM-5 schizoaffective disorders workgroup analyzed data made available to them in 2009, and reported in May 2013 that:

A recent review of psychotic disorders from large private insurance and Medicare databases in the U.S. found that the diagnosis of DSM-IV schizoaffective disorder was used for about a third of cases with non-affective psychotic disorders. Hence, this unreliable and poorly defined diagnosis is clearly overused.

As stated above, the DSM-IV schizoaffective disorder diagnosis is very inconsistently used and unreliable. A diagnosis is unreliable when several different mental health professionals observing the same individual make different diagnoses excessively. Even when a structured DSM-IV diagnostic interview and best estimate procedures were made by experts in the field that included information from family informants and prior clinical records, reliability was still poor for the DSM-IV schizoaffective diagnosis.

The DSM-IV schizoaffective diagnosis is not stable over time either. An initial diagnosis of schizoaffective disorder during time spent at a psychiatric inpatient facility was stable at 6-month and 24-month follow-ups for only 36% of patients. By comparison, diagnostic stability was 92% for schizophrenia, 83% for bipolar disorder, and 74% for major depression. Most patients diagnosed with DSM-IV schizoaffective disorder are later diagnosed with a different disorder, and that disorder is more stable over time than the DSM-IV schizoaffective disorder diagnosis.

In April 2009, Carpenter and the DSM-5 schizoaffective disorder workgroup reported that they were "developing new criteria for schizoaffective disorder to improve reliability and face validity," and were "determining whether the dimensional assessment of mood [would] justify a recommendation to drop schizoaffective disorder as a diagnostic category." Speaking to an audience at the May 2009 annual conference of the American Psychiatric Association, Carpenter said:

We had hoped to get rid of schizoaffective [disorder] as a diagnostic category [in the DSM-5] because we don't think it's [a] valid [scientific entity] and we don't think it's reliable. On the other hand, we think it's absolutely indispensable to clinical practice.

A major reason why DSM-IV schizoaffective disorder was indispensable to clinical practice is that it offered clinicians a diagnosis for patients with psychosis in the context of mood disorder whose clinical picture, at the time diagnosed, appeared different from DSM-IV "schizophrenia" or "mood disorder with psychotic features".

But DSM-IV schizoaffective disorder carries an unnecessarily worse prognosis than a "mood disorder with psychotic features" diagnosis, because long-term data revealed that a significant proportion of DSM-IV schizoaffective disorder patients had 15-year outcomes indistinguishable from patients with mood disorders with or without psychotic features, even though the clinical picture at the time of first diagnosis looked different from both schizophrenia and mood disorders.

These problems with the DSM-IV schizoaffective disorder definition result in most people the diagnosis is used on being misdiagnosed; furthermore, outcome studies done 10 years after the diagnosis was released showed that the group of patients defined by the DSM-IV and ICD-10 schizoaffective diagnosis had significantly better outcomes than predicted, so the diagnosis carries a misleading and unnecessarily poor prognosis. The DSM-IV criteria for schizoaffective disorder will continue to be used on U.S. board examinations in psychiatry through the end of 2014; established practitioners may continue to use the problematic DSM-IV definition much further into the future also.

==== DSM-5 research directions ====
The new schizoaffective disorder criteria continue to have questionable diagnostic validity. Questionable diagnostic validity does not doubt that people with symptoms of psychosis and mood disorder need treatment—psychosis and mood disorder must be treated. Instead, questionable diagnostic validity means there are unresolved problems with the way the DSM-5 categorizes and defines schizoaffective disorder.

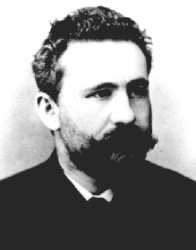
Emil Kraepelin's dichotomy (c. 1898) continues to influence classification and diagnosis in psychiatry.

A core concept in modern psychiatry since DSM-III was released in 1980, is the categorical separation of mood disorders from schizophrenia, known as the Kraepelinian dichotomy. Emil Kraepelin introduced the idea that schizophrenia was separate from mood disorders after observing patients with symptoms of psychosis and mood disorders over a century ago, in 1898. This was a time before genetics were known and before any treatments existed for mental illness. The Kraepelinian dichotomy was not used for DSM-I and DSM-II because both manuals were influenced by the dominant psychodynamic psychiatry of the time, but the designers of DSM-III wanted to use more scientific and biological definitions. Consequently, they looked to psychiatry's history and decided to use the Kraepelinian dichotomy as a foundation for the classification system.

The Kraepelinian dichotomy continues to be used in DSM-5 despite having been challenged by data from modern psychiatric genetics for over eight years, and there is now evidence of a significant overlap in the genetics of schizophrenia and bipolar disorder. According to this genetic evidence, the Kraepelinian categorical separation of mood disorders from schizophrenia at the foundation of the current classification and diagnostic system is a mistaken false dichotomy.

The dichotomy at the foundation of the current system forms the basis for a convoluted schizoaffective disorder definition in DSM-IV that resulted in excessive misdiagnosis. Real-life schizoaffective disorder patients have significant and enduring symptoms that bridge what are incorrectly assumed to be categorically separate disorders, schizophrenia and bipolar disorder. People with psychotic depression, bipolar disorder with a history of psychosis, and schizophrenia with mood symptoms also have symptoms that bridge psychosis and mood disorders. The categorical diagnostic manuals do not reflect reality in their separation of psychosis (via the schizophrenia diagnosis) from mood disorder, nor do they currently emphasize the actual overlap found in real-life patients. Thus, they are likely to continue to introduce either-or conceptual and diagnostic error, by way of confirmation bias into clinicians' mindsets, hindering accurate assessment and treatment.

The new definition continues the old definition's lack of parsimony. Simpler, clearer, and more usable definitions of the diagnosis were supported by certain members of the DSM-5 workgroup; these were debated but deemed premature, because more "research [is] needed to establish a new classification system of equal or greater validity" to the existing system. Because of DSM-5's continuing problematic categorical foundation, schizoaffective disorder's conceptual and diagnostic validity remains doubtful. After enough research is completed and data exists, future diagnostic advances will need to either eliminate and replace, or soften and bridge, the hard categorical separation of mood disorders from schizophrenia; most likely using a spectrum or dimensional approach to diagnosis.

More parsimonious definitions than the current one were considered by Carpenter and the DSM-5 workgroup:

One option for the DSM-5 would have been to remove the schizoaffective disorder category and to add affective [or mood] symptoms [that is, mania, hypomania, mixed episode, or depression] as a dimension to schizophrenia and schizophreniform disorder or to define a single category for the co-occurrence of psychosis and mood symptoms. This option was extensively debated but ultimately deemed to be premature in the absence of sufficient clinical and theoretical validating data justifying such a ... reconceptualization. Additionally, there appeared to be no practical way to introduce affect [or mood] dimensions covering the entire course of illness, that would capture the current concept of periods of psychosis related and unrelated to mood episodes.

[N]o valid biomarkers or laboratory measures have emerged to distinguish between affective psychosis [or psychotic mood disorders] and schizophrenia. To the contrary, the idea of a dichotomy between these types of conditions has proven naïve. [T]he admixture of "schizophrenic" and affective [or mood] symptoms is a feature of many, or even most, cases with severe mental illness. Most presenting symptoms of psychosis have little validity in determining diagnosis, prognosis, or treatment response in psychosis. [U]ltimately a more ... dimensional approach [to assessment and treatment] will be required.

The field of psychiatry has begun to question its assumptions and analyze its data to better align with evidence-based medicine. The removal of the "episode diagnosis", and the addition of two episodes of psychosis, as qualifications for the DSM-5 schizoaffective diagnosis, may improve the diagnosis' consistency over DSM-IV for research purposes, where diagnostic criteria are by necessity followed exactingly. But the new definition remains long, unwieldy, and perhaps still not very useful for community clinicians—with two psychoses, one for two weeks minimum and without mood disorder (but the person can be mildly or moderately depressed) and the other with significant mood disorder and psychosis lasting for most of the time, and with lasting mood symptoms for most of the residual portion of the illness. Community clinicians used the previous definition "for about a third of cases with non-affective psychotic disorders." Non-affective psychotic disorders are, by definition, not schizoaffective disorder. For clinicians to make such sizeable errors of misdiagnosis may imply systemic problems with the schizoaffective disorder diagnosis itself. Already, at least one expert believes the new schizoaffective definition has not gone far enough to solve the previous definition's problems.

Scientifically speaking, modern clinical psychiatry is still in an early stage of development, largely because the human brain is not yet understood well enough to support comprehensive biological models of mental illness. Although projects like the Human Connectome Project and CLARITY have begun mapping neural circuits, much of the brain's structure and function remains unclear. The field has acknowledged its past limitations, but significant improvements are still needed to reduce misdiagnosis and prevent patient harm—key factors in maintaining public trust. To address unresolved issues such as the nature of schizoaffective disorder, psychiatry may require a major shift in research strategy. The NIMH's Research Domain Criteria (RDoC) project may provide a framework capable of guiding that shift.

== Treatment ==
The primary treatment of schizoaffective disorder is medication, with improved outcomes using combined long-term psychological and social supports. Hospitalization may occur for severe episodes either voluntarily or (if mental health legislation allows it) involuntarily. Long-term hospitalization is uncommon since deinstitutionalization started in the 1950s, although it still occurs. Community support services including drop-in centers, visits by members of a community mental health team, supported employment and support groups are common. Evidence indicates that regular exercise has a positive effect on the physical and mental health of those with schizoaffective disorder.

Because of the heterogeneous symptomology associated with schizoaffective disorder, it is common for patients to be misdiagnosed. Many people are either diagnosed with depression, schizophrenia, or bipolar disorder instead of schizoaffective disorder. Because of the broad range of symptoms of Schizoaffective disorder, patients are often misdiagnosed in a clinical setting. In fact, almost 39% of people are misdiagnosed when it comes to psychiatric disorders.

While various medications and treatment options exist for those diagnosed with schizoaffective disorder, symptoms may continue to impact a person for their entire lifespan.Schizoaffective disorder can affect a person's ability to experience a fulfilling social life and they may also exhibit difficulty forming bonds or relationships with others. Schizoaffective disorder is more likely to occur in women and symptoms begin manifesting at a young age.

=== Therapy ===
Psychosocial treatments have been found to improve outcomes related to schizoaffective disorder. Supportive psychotherapy and cognitive behavioral therapy are both helpful. Intensive case management (ICM) has been shown to reduce hospitalizations, improve adherence to treatment, and improve social functioning. With ICM, clients are assigned a case manager responsible for coordination of care and assisting clients to access supports to address needs in multiple areas related to well-being, including housing.

Psychiatric/psychosocial rehabilitation is often a component of schizoaffective disorder treatment. This rehabilitation method focuses on solving community integration problems such as obtaining and keeping housing and increasing involvement in positive social groups. It also focuses on improving and increasing activities of daily living; increasing daily healthy habits and decreasing unhealthy behaviors, thereby significantly improving quality of life. Psychiatric rehabilitation may also focus on vocational rehabilitation. Evidence suggests that cognition-based approaches may be able to improve work and social functioning.

Psychiatric rehabilitation consists of eight main areas:

- Psychiatric (symptom reduction and management)
- Health and Medical (maintaining consistency of care)
- Housing (safe environments)
- Basic living skills (hygiene, meals [including increasing healthy food intake and reducing processed food intake], safety, planning and chores)
- Social (relationships, family boundaries, communication and integration of client into the community)
- Education and vocation (coping skills, motivation and suitable goals chosen by client)
- Finance (personal budget)
- Community and legal (resources)

=== Medication ===
Antipsychotic medication is usually required both for acute treatment and the prevention of relapse. There is no single antipsychotic of choice in treating schizoaffective disorder, but atypical antipsychotics may be considered due to their mood-stabilizing abilities. To date, paliperidone (Invega) is the only antipsychotic with Food and Drug Administration (FDA) approval for the treatment of schizoaffective disorder. Other antipsychotics may be prescribed to further alleviate psychotic symptoms.

The management of the bipolar type of schizoaffective disorder is similar to the treatment of bipolar disorder, with the goal of preventing mood episodes and cycling. Lithium or anticonvulsant mood stabilizers such as valproic acid, carbamazepine, and lamotrigine are prescribed in combination with an antipsychotic.Antidepressants have also been used to treat schizoaffective disorder. Though they may be useful in treating the depressive subtype of the disorder, research suggests that antidepressants are far less effective in treatment than antipsychotics and mood stabilizers.

Some research has supported the efficacy of anxiolytics in treating schizoaffective disorder, though general findings on their effectiveness in treating schizoaffective disorder remain inconclusive. Due to the severe negative outcomes associated with many anti-anxiety drugs, many researchers have cautioned against their long term use in treatment.

==== Clozapine ====
Clozapine is FDA-approved for treatment resistant schizophrenia. Though not approved specifically for schizoaffective disorder by the FDA, research suggests that clozapine may also be effective in treating schizoaffective disorder, particularly in those resistant to initial medication. Clozapine is an atypical antipsychotic that is recognized as being particularly effective when other antipsychotic agents have failed. When combined with cognitive therapy, clozapine has been found to decrease positive and negative symptoms of psychosis at a higher rate in schizoaffective individuals. Clozapine has also been associated with a decreased risk of suicide attempts in patients with schizoaffective disorder and a history of suicidality.

Despite clozapine being highly effective at treating schizophrenia and schizoaffective disorder, clozapine treatment may be ineffective for some patients, particularly in those that are already drug-resistant. Clozapine has more side effects than other atypical antipsychotics. Serious side effects of clozapine include agranulocytosis and neutropenia. To mitigate the possibility of agranulocytosis and neutropenia, patients taking clozapine often have regular blood tests.

=== Electroconvulsive therapy ===
Electroconvulsive therapy (ECT) may be considered for patients with schizoaffective disorder experiencing severe depression or severe psychotic symptoms that have not responded to treatment with antipsychotics.

== Epidemiology ==
Compared to depression, schizophrenia, and bipolar disorder, schizoaffective disorder is less commonly diagnosed. Schizoaffective disorder is estimated to occur in 0.3 to 0.8 percent of people at some point in their life. 30% of cases occur between the ages of 25 and 35. It is more common in women than men; however, this is because of the high concentration of women in the depressive subcategory, whereas the bipolar subtype has a roughly even gender distribution. Children are less likely to be diagnosed with this disorder, as the onset presents itself in adolescence or young adulthood.

== History ==
The term schizoaffective psychosis was introduced by the American psychiatrist Jacob Kasanin in 1933 to describe an episodic psychotic illness with predominant affective symptoms, that was thought at the time to be a good-prognosis schizophrenia. Kasanin's concept of the illness was influenced by the psychoanalytic teachings of Adolf Meyer and Kasanin postulated that schizoaffective psychosis was caused by "emotional conflicts" of a "mainly sexual nature" and that psychoanalysis "would help prevent the recurrence of such attacks." He based his description on a case study of nine individuals.

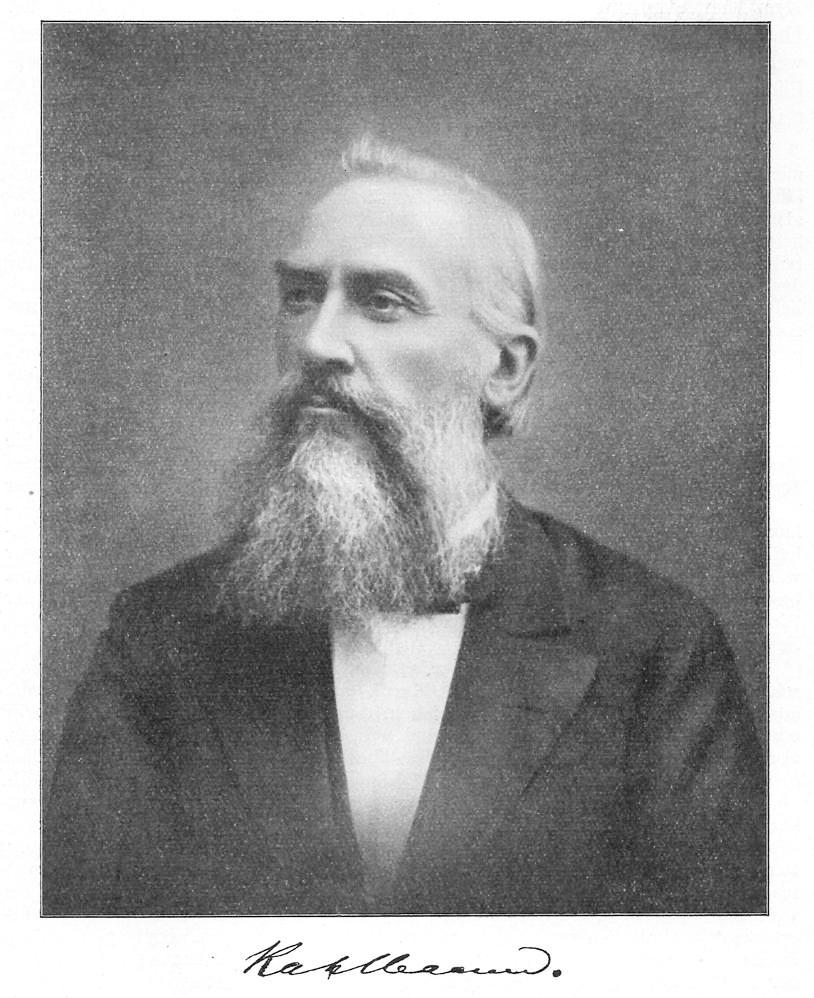
Karl Kahlbaum (1828–1899)

Other psychiatrists, before and after Kasanin, have made scientific observations of schizoaffective disorder based on assumptions of a biological and genetic cause of the illness. In 1863, German psychiatrist Karl Kahlbaum (1828–1899) described schizoaffective disorders as a separate group in his vesania typica circularis. Kahlbaum distinguished between cross-sectional and longitudinal observations. In 1920, psychiatrist Emil Kraepelin (1856–1926) observed a "great number" of cases that had characteristics of both groups of psychoses that he originally posited were two distinct and separate illnesses, dementia praecox (now called schizophrenia) and manic depressive insanity (now called bipolar disorders and recurrent depression).

Kraepelin acknowledged that "there are many overlaps in this area," that is, the area between schizophrenia and mood disorders. In 1959, psychiatrist Kurt Schneider (1887–1967) began to further refine conceptualizations of the different forms that schizoaffective disorders can take since he observed "concurrent and sequential types". (The concurrent type of illness he referred to is a longitudinal course of illness with episodes of mood disorder and psychosis occurring predominantly at the same time [now called psychotic mood disorders or affective psychosis]; while his sequential type refers to a longitudinal course predominantly marked by alternating mood and psychotic episodes.) Schneider described schizoaffective disorders as "cases in-between" the traditional Kraepelinian dichotomy of schizophrenia and mood disorders.

The historical clinical observation that schizoaffective disorder is an overlap of schizophrenia and mood disorders is explained by genes for both illnesses being present in individuals with schizoaffective disorder; specifically, recent research shows that schizophrenia and mood disorders share common genes and polygenic variations.

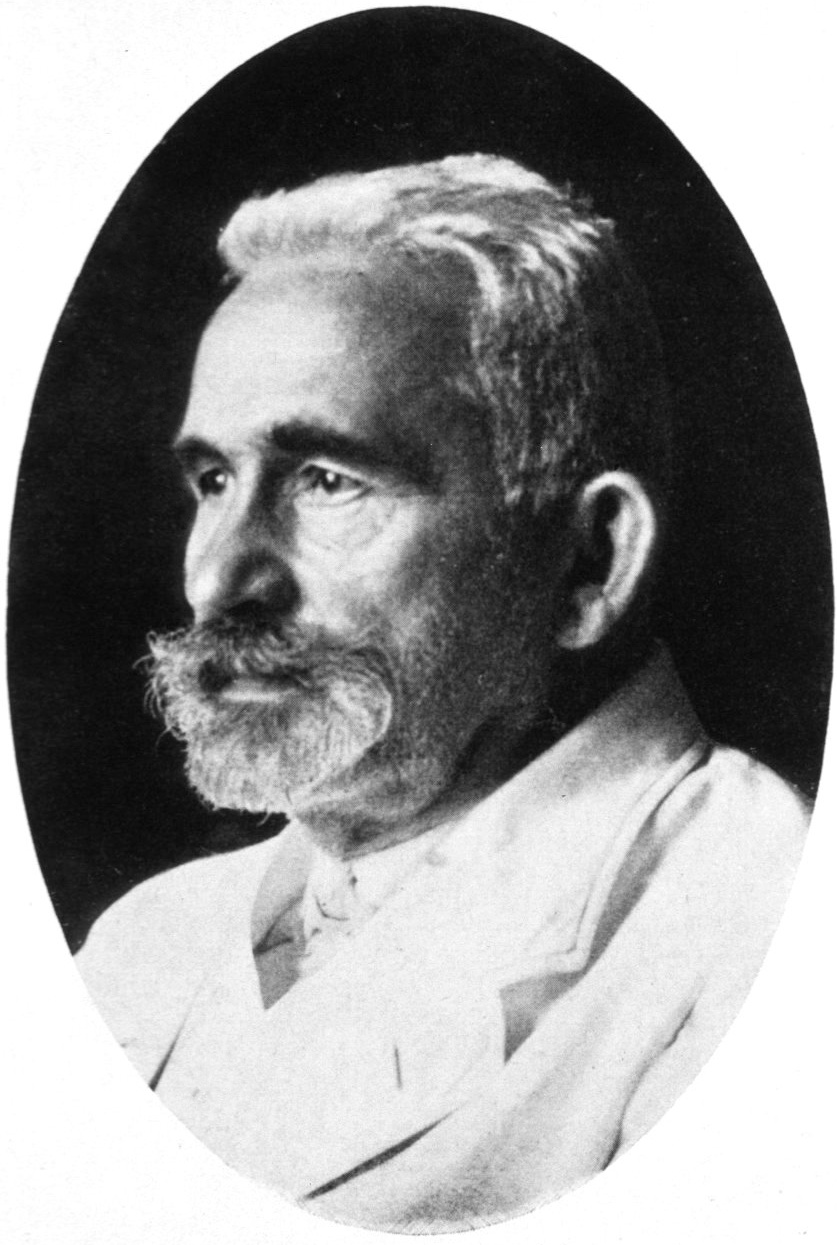
Emil Kraepelin (1856–1926). Embracing the Kraepelinian dichotomy in DSM-III in 1980, while a step forward from psychodynamic explanations of the disorder, introduced significant problems in schizoaffective disorder diagnosis, as explained recently by the DSM-5 workgroup.

Schizoaffective disorder was included as a subtype of schizophrenia in DSM-I and DSM-II, though research showed a schizophrenic cluster of symptoms in individuals with a family history of mood disorders whose illness course, other symptoms and treatment outcome were otherwise more akin to bipolar disorder than to schizophrenia. DSM-III placed schizoaffective disorder in "Psychotic Disorders Not Otherwise Specified" before being formally recognized in DSM-III-R. DSM-III-R included its own diagnostic criteria as well as the subtypes, bipolar and depressive. In DSM-IV, published in 1994, schizoaffective disorders belonged to the category "Other Psychotic Disorders" and included almost the same criteria and the same subtypes of illness as DSM-III-R, with the addition of mixed bipolar symptomatology.

DSM-IV and DSM-IV-TR (published in 2000) criteria for schizoaffective disorder were poorly defined and poorly operationalized. These ambiguous and unreliable criteria lasted 19 years and led clinicians to significantly overuse the schizoaffective disorder diagnosis. Patients commonly diagnosed with DSM-IV schizoaffective disorder showed a clinical picture at time of diagnosis that appeared different from schizophrenia or psychotic mood disorders using DSM-IV criteria, but who as a group, were longitudinally determined to have outcomes indistinguishable from those with mood disorders with or without psychotic features. A poor prognosis was assumed to apply to these patients by most clinicians, and this poor prognosis was harmful to many patients. The poor prognosis for DSM-IV schizoaffective disorder was not based on patient outcomes research, but was caused by poorly defined criteria interacting with clinical tradition and belief; clinician enculturation with unscientific assumptions from the diagnosis' history (discussed above), including the invalid Kraepelinian dichotomy; and by clinicians being unfamiliar with the scientific limitations of the diagnostic and classification system.

The DSM-5 schizoaffective disorder workgroup analyzed all of the available research evidence on schizoaffective disorder, and concluded that "presenting symptoms of psychosis have little validity in determining diagnosis, prognosis, or treatment response." Given our understanding of overlapping genetics in bipolar disorders, schizoaffective disorder, and schizophrenia, as well as the overlap in treatments for these disorders; but given the lack of specificity of presenting symptoms for determining diagnosis, prognosis or treatment response in these psychotic illness syndromes, the limits of our knowledge are clearer: Presenting symptoms of psychosis describe only presenting symptoms to be treated, and not much more. Schizoaffective disorder was changed to a longitudinal or life course diagnosis in DSM-5 for this reason.

Stigma of schizoaffective disorder include moralist arguments, religious causes, and others during history.

== Research ==
Little is known of the causes and mechanisms that lead to the development of schizoaffective disorder. Whether schizoaffective disorder is a variant of schizophrenia (as in DSM-5 and ICD-10 classification systems), a variant of bipolar disorder, or part of a dimensional continuum between psychotic depression, bipolar disorders and schizophrenia is currently being investigated.

More recently, some research suggests the need for a more specialized classification for schizoaffective disorder. In a 2017 examining diagnostic heterogeneity study, researchers found that when compared to a schizophrenia sample, individuals with schizoaffective disorder rate higher in suicidality and anxiety disorder comorbidity.

== See also ==
- Schizophrenia
- Bipolar disorder
