= Unipolar mania =

State that occurs in bipolar disorder

Unipolar mania is a form of bipolar disorder whereby individuals only experience manic episodes without depression. Depression is often characterised by a persistent low mood, decreased energy and thoughts of suicide. What is seen as its counterpart, mania, can be characterized by racing thoughts, less need for sleep and psychomotor agitation.

The concept of bipolar disorder was initially introduced by Baillarger, Falret and Grinsinger in the 19th century. However, German psychiatrist Emil Kraepelin was the first to discover the category of manic depressive disorder, and this eventually led to the appearance of bipolar disorder in the third edition of the Diagnostic and Statistical Manual of Mental Disorders (DSM-3). It was also Kraeplin who first used the term of "periodic mania" in 1889, to refer to people with recurrent manic episodes and no depression. The following year, Carl Wernicke proposed that mania and depression should be viewed as separate disorders. Some years later in 1979, the two forms were individualised in the literature.

Further research led to the suggestion that there is a distinction between unipolar mania and manic-depressive psychosis and that this may have a genetic basis. However this has not yet been tested. Research on unipolar mania has continued to evolve but has not been acknowledged in the most recent edition of the DSM (DSM-5). As the time went on, unipolar mania has become an invalid diagnosis due to its variations across different patients. Currently patients with symptoms of mania, even in the absence of any depressive symptoms, would get the bipolar I diagnosis.

== Clinical features ==
Despite the lack of acknowledgment of unipolar mania as a separate disorder, studies have found significant differences between the clinical features of unipolar mania and bipolar disorder.

Individuals with unipolar mania are less likely to experience:

1. Depressive features
2. Diurnal variation of mood
3. Hallucination
4. Comorbid anxiety disorders and anxiety symptoms
5. Suicidal ideas or attempts
6. Hostility
7. Rapid Cycling and Cyclothymia (both common features in Bipolar Disorder)

However are more likely to:

1. Experience delusions
2. Exhibit formal thought disorder
3. Have abused drugs in the past, in particular marijuana and amphetamines
4. Have hyperthymia

The episodes experienced by individuals with unipolar mania, generally have a stronger tendency to present with psychosis or/and need psychiatric assistance. Psychotic features tend to also be higher at both the start and throughout the course of unipolar mania.

== Prevalence and diagnosis criteria ==
Generally, there are two aspects which are taken into consideration when unipolar mania is being defined. This includes the length of the illness and how many manic episodes the individual has. Currently, there is a lack of clarity over how prevalent this disorder is and the number of individuals who have been diagnosed with bipolar disorder, despite not experiencing depressive periods. This is due to the fact that in studies of unipolar mania, researchers have differed in their definitions and diagnosis criteria's. The prevalence of this disorder has a large range from as low as 1.1% of bipolar disorder cases, to 65.3%

It was Carlo Perris' definition in 1966, which was most commonly used in studies on this topic during the 1970s and early 1980s. He defined unipolar mania to be present, when an individual has a minimum of one manic episode without experiencing any depressive episodes. The prevalence of this disorder when based upon this definition, was up to 35.2% of all bipolar inpatients.

Other definitions of unipolar mania in research include, at least three manic episodes without the experience of a depressive period for the length of the study. In this study 56.6% of the sample of 173 patients experienced only manic episodes. Another study defined this disorder as a minimum of one hospitalisation for a manic episode but no hospitalisation or sematic treatment for depression. Using this definition, it was found that 15.7% of individuals diagnosed with Bipolar 1 in fact have unipolar mania. In a research study which used the diagnosis criteria of having 3 manic episodes without any depressive episodes, unipolar mania was prevalent in 40% of the bipolar inpatients.

Not only do the diagnosis criteria vary in studies on unipolar mania, but the duration of the follow ups also do. In Nurnberger's study, a 4-month follow up was conducted, and in this time 29% of unipolar mania cases were reclassified as true bipolar disorder. This differed to a study where researchers conducted a follow up after 27.7 years and did not find any change in their patients' polarity.

== Socio-demographic characteristics ==
A person hallucinating and hearing voices.

A large proportion of studies on unipolar mania have come from non-western countries. However, this does not mean the disorder is more common in these countries. For this conclusion to be drawn, there is a need for more cross-cultural research. One cross-cultural study was carried out in France and Tunisia, two countries that vary in their geographical and cultural environment. The study involved selecting 40 patients from both countries and researchers found that unipolar mania was three times more common in Tunisia than in France. Researchers suggested that the temperature of the country may explain these findings, however there is no research to support this claim.

Studies have also attempted to identify sex differences for this disorder. One study conducted in 1979, found that there was a male preponderance and similarly, a study in 1986 also found that unipolar mania occurred twice as often in men than it did in women. Regarding age, one study found the age of onset was younger for individuals with Unipolar Mania compared to those with bipolar disorder. However, for both sex and age, findings do not replicate and other research fails to find any significant differences.

== Research ==
Unipolar mania is considered to be an invalid diagnosis and due to this, it has been a popular topic of research to investigate variation in symptoms across different patients and explore the phenomenon of unipolar mania further.

=== Longitudinal studies ===
Longitudinal studies have been used to assess the validity of unipolar mania as a separate diagnosis and to distinguish it from bipolar I disorder. Solomon et al. (2003) looked at the condition of participants when they first entered the study and followed up on them for a period of 15 years. This was done through the use of the Longitudinal Internal Follow-Up Evaluation, looking at the participants psychopathology, every 6 months for the first 5 years and then on an annual basis. It was found that those who were categorised as having mania, without any signs of depression, at the start of the study, also didn't have any major or minor signs of depression during the 15 year follow-up. From this it can be understood that unipolar mania should be a separate diagnostic category from bipolar I disorder, as although the DSM-IV is inclusive for people to have unipolar mania within the bipolar I diagnosis, it however doesn't include the long-term course which unipolar mania can have on individuals. Hence, illustrating, the prevalence of unipolar mania as a distinct condition, however due to being a rare entity, claiming for it to be a separate diagnosis needs further research and evidence.

=== Meta-analysis ===
Studies employing meta-analysis, as a research design, have found consistent findings as those with longitudinal studies. For example, Yazıcı et al. compiled data from the PubMed records through searching for mania-based keywords throughout the database like unipolar mania and pure mania. Manual searching was also used to find any cross-reference points and recent publications. Although this form of research has various limitations, it has managed to yield valuable data in exploring the phenomenon of unipolar mania further. Such meta-analysis research has found variations in the way unipolar mania is expressed in individuals without depression.

=== Case studies ===
To further previous research conducted on unipolar mania, case studies have been employed as a research method to find clinical differences between mania and bipolar I disorder across different parameters.

A recent example of such case study is by Gorgulu et al. (2021), who studied patients from the Department of Psychiatry in Trakya University Hospital. The study consisted of a group of 38 patients, aged 18–65, who met the diagnostic category for unipolar mania as they had experienced a minimum of four manic episodes and were in the euthymic period. The second group consisted of 42 patients, aged 18–65, who were diagnosed with bipolar I disorder (as per the DSM-IV), due to previously experiencing both manic and depressive episodes whilst also being in the euthymic period. To assess the differences between the two disorders, hospitalisation files were retrospectively reviewed to check for all manic episodes, in order to compare symptoms during these episodes. Further, to assess these differences across parameters, the blood samples of patients were taken and analysed during fasting conditions to check for neurotrophins such as brain-derived neurotrophic factor (BDNF), which is the most common neurotrophin found in the brain and is significantly reduced in patients with bipolar disorder.

The findings of this case study include:

- No statistical difference in the mean ages of the two groups
- 8.08% of the patients with bipolar I diagnosis also met the diagnostic criteria for unipolar mania
- Unipolar mania ran more common amongst males while bipolar I disorder was more common amongst the females
- Statistically significant difference was found in the manic symptoms amongst the two groups, with the symptoms being more common in patients with unipolar mania than the patients with bipolar disorder
  - These include symptoms like increased sexual interest, delusions, and euphoria
- Similar BDNF levels between the two groups

== Criticisms ==
Currently, there is no valid explanation on the causes of unipolar mania and consequently there is no treatment. There also remains uncertainty whether unipolar mania is separate to bipolar disorder and researchers including Yazıcı have raised concerns about its diagnosis. The first concern is that research may not have assessed patients previous depressive episodes. The second concern is that the patients follow ups may not be long enough to witness any potential future depressions. There is also research showing that clinical features and socio-demographic characteristics of bipolar disorder and unipolar mania patients are homogenous; any differences are non-significant. With disparities in both diagnosis criteria and research findings, as well as the small sample sizes in the studies, unipolar mania as a separate disorder is under scrutiny.

== See also ==
- Bipolar I Disorder
- Mania
- Hyperthymic temperament
- Outline of bipolar disorder
- Depression mood
- Diagnostic and Statistical Manual of Mental Disorders
- Diagnostic criteria
- Euthymia (medicine)
- Neurotrophin
- Brain-derived neurotrophic factor
