= Outline of bipolar disorder =

Overview of and topical guide to bipolar disorder

Bipolar disorder is a mental disorder with cyclical periods of depression and periods of elevated mood. The elevated mood is significant and is known as mania, a severe elevation that can be accompanied by psychosis in some cases, or hypomania, a milder form of mania. During mania, an individual behaves or feels abnormally energetic, elated, or irritable. Individuals often make poorly thought out decisions with little regard to the consequences. The need for sleep is usually reduced during manic phases.

During periods of depression, there may be crying, a negative outlook on life, and poor eye contact with others. The risk of suicide among those with the illness is high at greater than 6 percent over 20 years, while self-harm occurs in 30–40 percent. Other mental health issues such as anxiety disorders and substance use disorder are commonly associated. Also known as manic depression. People with bipolar disorder experience the whole spectrum of emotional feelings from unimaginable grief to full blown euphoria whereas normal people experience only a section of the spectrum of emotional feelings somewhere between extreme grief and extreme happiness.

== Classification ==
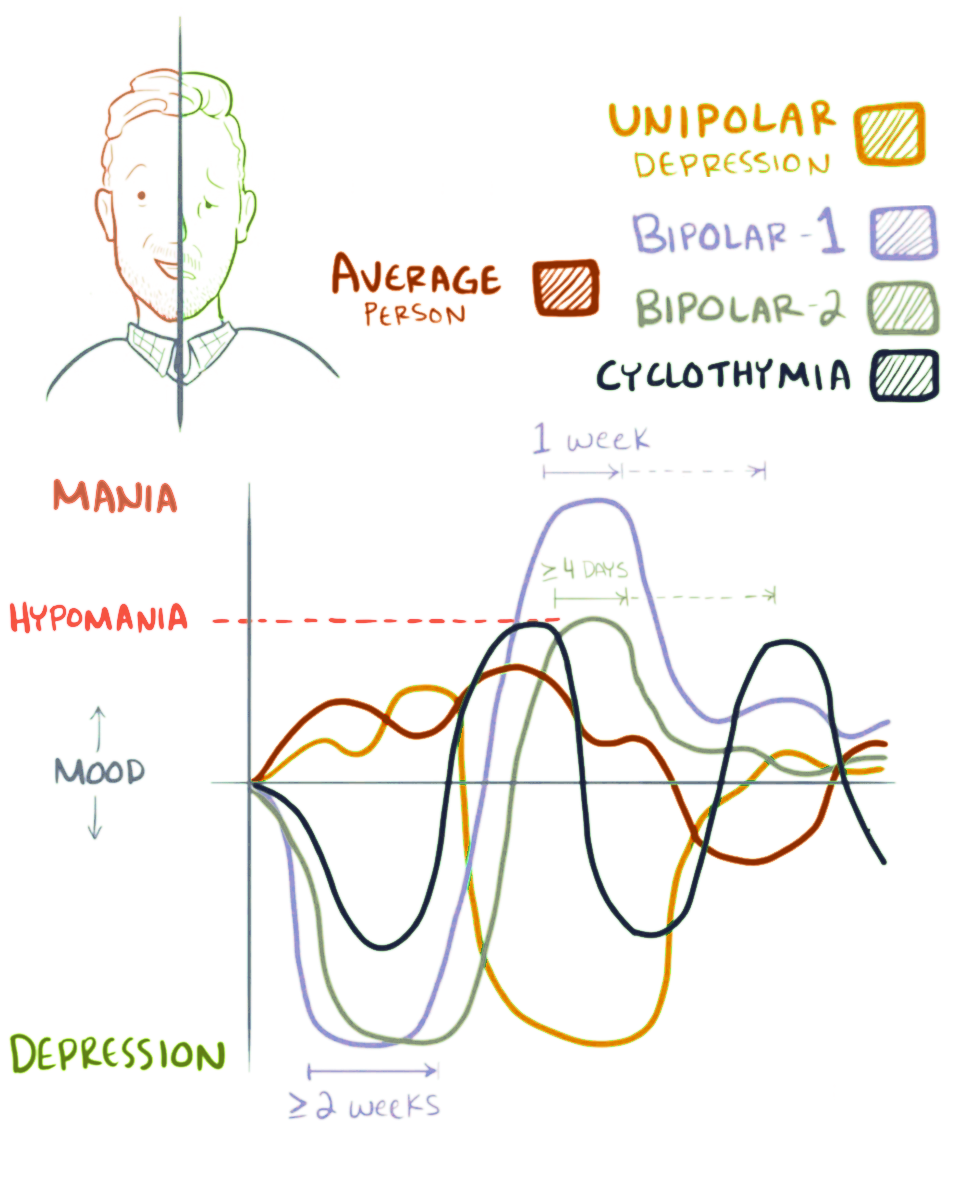
A graph showing variable moods in different bipolar disorder subtypes compared to unaffected individuals and people with unipolar depression

Bipolar disorder can be described as all of the following:

- Disorder –
  - Mental disorder – functional abnormality or disturbance characterized by a behavioral or mental pattern that may cause suffering or a poor ability to function in life. Such features may be persistent, relapsing and remitting, or occur as a single episode.
    - More specifically, bipolar disorder can be characterized by extreme mood swings, ranging from extreme peaks or "highs" of happiness, otherwise known as hypomania, to heightened lows of sadness and depression.

== Bipolar spectrum ==
Bipolar spectrum –

- Bipolar I – bipolar disorder with at least one manic episode (with or without psychotic features), possibly with hypomanic and/or depressive episodes as well
- Psychotic features – psychosis experienced in some cases of Bipolar I disorder, typically during mania or a severe depressive episode
- Bipolar II – bipolar disorder categorized by depressive episodes and at least one hypomanic episode, no manic episode experienced
- Bipolar disorder not otherwise specified – bipolar disorder when it does not fall within the other established sub-types
- Cyclothymia – a milder form of bipolar disorder with predominantly depressive symptoms and some symptoms of hypomania, does not meet diagnostic severity of bipolar I or II
- Dysthymia – akin to depression, with chronic symptoms
- Major depressive disorder – a mood disorder involving low mood, low energy, poor self-esteem, lack of interest in enjoyable activities, and/or aches and pains
- Schizoaffective disorder – cyclical mood episodes combined with psychosis; has subtypes: bipolar type and depressive type
- Mania – a state of hyperactivity, heightened mood (euphoric or irritable), low sleep, pressured speech, grandiosity, and/or racing thoughts; may include psychotic features like delusions or hallucinations
- Unipolar mania – a state that occurs in bipolar disorder where individuals only experience manic episodes without depression
- Mixed affective state – a state with traits of both mania and depression (e.g. irritability, low mood, suicidality, and racing thoughts at the same time)
- Hypomania – an episode of elevated mood, similar to mania with milder symptomatic severity
- Major depressive episode – a mood episode with major depressive symptoms

== Symptoms of bipolar disorder ==
=== Signs typical of mania ===
- Delusion – fixed belief that cannot be changed despite reason or evidence, not explained by common cultural beliefs
- Hallucination – perceiving something that is not actually present
- Insomnia – difficulty falling and/or staying asleep
- Pressured speech – rapid, erratic, and/or frenzied speech that can be difficult for others to understand and interrupt
- Psychosis – inability to distinguish between reality and fantasy
- Racing thoughts – rapid thinking, sometimes experienced as distracting or distressing

=== Signs typical of depression ===
- Anhedonia – reduced ability to experience pleasure
- Dysphoria – a state of profound unhappiness or discomfort
- Hypersomnia – excessive sleeping and/or sleepiness
- Self harm – causing intentional pain or injury to the body, often as self-punishment or emotional release
- Suicidal ideation – considering committing suicide

=== Non-specific symptoms ===
- Anxiety – a state of increased stress and worry
- Emotional dysregulation – difficulty regulating one's mood, resulting in mood swings
- Sleep disorder – disordered sleeping habits

== Treatment of bipolar disorder ==
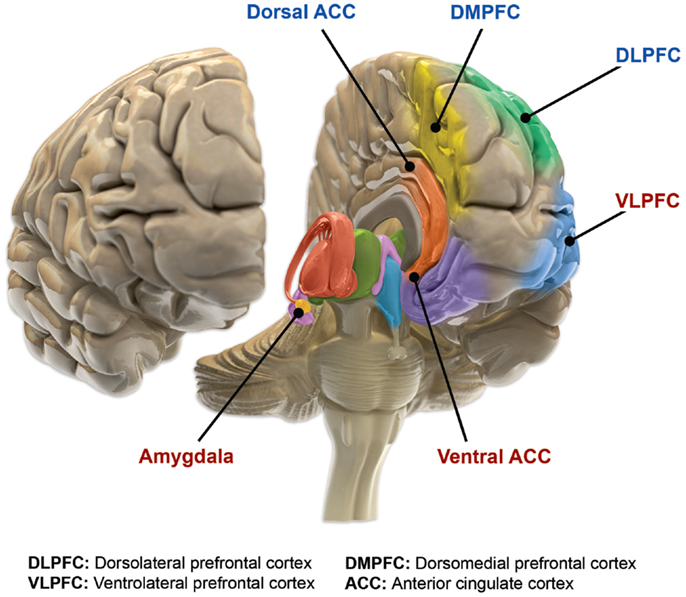
Areas of the brain affected by bipolar disorder.

- Mood stabilizers – medication that reduces mood swings and allows the user to experience a more typical range of moods
  - Anticonvulsants
    - Carbamazepine
    - Gabapentin
    - Lamotrigine (Lamictal)
    - Oxcarbazepine
    - Topiramate
    - Valproic acid, sodium valproate, and valproate semisodium
  - Lithium (medication) – lithium carbonate and lithium citrate
- Antipsychotics
- Anxiolytics
  - List of benzodiazepines

== Non-pharmaceutical treatment of bipolar disorder ==
- Psychotherapy
- Involuntary commitment
- Electroconvulsive therapy
- Transcranial magnetic stimulation
- Light therapy

== History of bipolar disorder ==
- Emil Kraepelin – introduced the dichotomy between 'manic-depressive insanity' and 'dementia praecox', what we later know as bipolar disorder and schizophrenia.
- Karl Leonhard – introduced the terms 'bipolar' and 'unipolar'.
- John Cade – discovered lithium as a medicine in Australia in 1949.
- Mogens Schou – completed first controlled study on use of lithium in bipolar disorder treatment.
- Frederick K. Goodwin – was the former director of the National Institute of Mental Health.
- Kay Redfield Jamison – wrote the main textbook on bipolar disorder together with Frederick Goodwin, Manic-Depressive Illness: Bipolar Disorders and Recurrent Depression.

== Organisations ==
- International Society for Bipolar Disorders (ISBD)
- Depression and Bipolar Support Alliance (DBSA)
- Collaborative RESearch Team to study psychosocial issues in Bipolar Disorder (CREST.BD)
- Bipolar UK
- National Alliance on Mental Illness

== See also ==
- Affective spectrum – spectrum of mood disorders, including disorders that impact other areas in addition to mood (e.g. ADHD and migraines)
- Bipolar disorder in children – pediatric bipolar disorder, which sometimes involves more rapid shifting and mixed states
- Biology of bipolar disorder
- Epigenetics of bipolar disorder
- Sleep in bipolar disorder
- Associated features of bipolar disorder
- List of people with bipolar disorder
- List of fictional characters with bipolar disorder
- Bipolar Disorders (journal)
