= Sleep in bipolar disorder =

Sleep is known to play an important role in the etiology and maintenance of bipolar disorder. Patients with bipolar disorder often have a less stable and more variable circadian activity. Circadian activity disruption can be apparent even if the person concerned is not currently ill.

A decreased need for sleep is a symptom of both a manic episode and a hypomanic episode in bipolar disorder. Sleep disturbances are often a prodrome for the onset of a manic, hypomanic or depressive episode. Current research on circadian and sleep-wake processes shows that they play an important role in the etiology and maintenance of bipolar disorder. Previous studies showed that the circadian system can modulate the current mood state with positive affect. When challenged, it can have negative mood consequences.

The social zeitgeber hypothesis therefore proposes that in bipolar disorder the fundamental circadian instability can be moderated by the stabilization of daily rhythms and zeitgeber. According to the hypothesis, a disruption (e.g. life event) could trigger depressive, hypomanic or manic episodes. Inversely, a regular daily rhythm can have a positive effect and lead to a normalization of the circadian system. The goal of treatment programs like the interpersonal and social rhythm therapy is to regulate the social rhythms of a patient and thereby normalize the biological rhythms.

== REM sleep in bipolar disorder ==
Current research on REM sleep found that REM sleep is critical in the processing of episodic emotional memories. When the REM sleep activity in patients with unipolar or bipolar depression were measured, often an increased REM density was found. The increased REM density in unipolar and bipolar depression might have two implications. First, it could represent a failed attempt to depotentiate negative emotional experiences during the sleep. Another possible implication is that the increased REM density may pathologically reinforce negative self-narratives and maintain negative moods after sleeping. Both hypotheses are not yet fully proven but show the importance of sleep and sleep disruptions in bipolar disorder and the need for further research.

== Sleep disorders and bipolar disorder ==
The diagnosis of a bipolar disorder is linked to various sleep disorders. Comorbidities include insomnia and hypersomnia. Other related sleep disturbances are delayed sleep phase syndrome, circadian-rhythm sleep disorder, sleep apnea, REM sleep abnormalities and irregular sleep-wake schedules.

Bipolar disorder is also linked with higher rates of suicidal ideation and suicidal attempts. It has been shown that sleep disturbances can have an influence on the suicidality of patients with bipolar disorder. One study found that poor sleep quality and nightmares can increase the risk for suicidal ideation and suicidal attempts.

== Genetic vulnerability ==
Bipolar disorder is known to have a high heritability. Therefore, sleep disturbances in bipolar disorder could also have a genetic basis. Studies found modest associations between several genes that are known to be associated with the generation and regulation of circadian rhythms and bipolar disorder. Two locus interactions between sleep disturbances of the rs11824092 (ARNTL) and rs11932595 (CLOCK) were found in one study.

== Sleep disturbances and relapse ==
Sleep disturbances in bipolar disorder are also an important marker for relapse. Multiple studies found evidence that sleep disturbances contribute to relapse. Sleep disturbances are the most common prodrome of a manic episode and the sixth most common prodrome of a depressive episode.

== Sleep disturbance as a residual symptom of a bipolar disorder ==
Sleep disturbance is not only associated with the onset of manic or hypomanic episodes but also displays a residual symptom of manic and depressive episodes. They are associated with residual depressive symptoms and perceived cognitive performance and can thereby negatively influence the functioning and recovery of a patient. This is one reason why therapy programs such as interpersonal and social rhythm therapy aim to reduce sleep disturbances.

== Treatment possibilities regarding the sleep disturbances in bipolar disorder ==
=== Interpersonal and social rhythm therapy ===
A main goal of interpersonal and social rhythm therapy (IPSRT) is to regulate both circadian rhythms and sleep–wake cycles. To achieve this goal, maintaining regular daily rhythms for exercising, eating, sleeping and waking are central to IPSRT. Research has shown that the sleep-wake cycle (circadian rhythms and sleep) can be moderated by social and volitional factors. Based on this chronobiological model, IPSRT aims to manage bipolar symptomatology.

=== Light therapy for bipolar disorder ===
A recent study also suggests that bipolar disorder is linked with an enhanced sensitivity to light. In the study, four of the five women who received a midday light session responded well. Three of the four who received light in the morning developed a mixed state, and the others responded well. The authors conclude that light therapy is possibly an effective augmentation strategy in the treatment of bipolar disorder.

=== Total or partial sleep deprivation ===
Another proposed treatment for sleep disturbances is total or partial sleep deprivation. Total or partial sleep deprivation has been found to induce an increased mood in depressed bipolar patients. Problematically depressive symptoms often seem to return soon after the patient has slept. Two theories hypothesize, that circadian mechanisms might be the reason.

According to the internal coincidence model, depressed patients are not sleeping at the right biological clock time because the phase angle between the sleep-wake cycle and the biological clock is out of alignment. Based on this theory sleep deprivation works at first because it prevents sleep at the critical phase but in recovery sleep, the misalignment is reinstated.

In the two process model of sleep, it has been proposed, that depression is characterized by a deficiency in the building up of process S. Therefore, sleep deprivation might increase process S in the beginning, but a relapse occurs, when sleep deprivations isn't applied anymore and process S returns to a low level.

== See also ==
- Outline of bipolar disorder
