= Hyperthymic temperament =

Hyperthymia
- Other names: Hyperthymic temperament, hyperthymic personality-type, hypomanic personality
- Specialty: Psychiatry, clinical psychology -although its classification as a disorder is still disputed
- Symptoms: High self-esteem, increased energy, decreased need for sleep, euphoria, boundless optimism, impulsivity, talkativeness, hypersexuality, etc.
- Complications: Increased risk of bipolar disorder, substance abuse
- Usual onset: Before 21 years old
- Causes: Genetic, environmental, and psychological factors
- Risk factors: Unknown, family history
- Diagnostic method: Based on symptoms
- Treatment: Often not needed, unless potential complications develop

Hyperthymic temperament, or hyperthymia, is an affective temperament characterized by an outgoing, cheerful disposition and an exceptionally positive mood. It is generally defined by increased energy, sociability, and enthusiasm for life activities. It is often contrasted with dysthymic temperament. The elevated mood that is associated with hyperthymic temperament shares features with hypomania, but is thought to remain relatively stable over time. Interpretations of hyperthymic temperament differ in focus, particularly regarding its relevance to the bipolar spectrum. It has been described as both a variation in normal affective temperament and a potential indicator of bipolar predisposition.

Characteristics of the hyperthymic temperament include:

- increased energy and productivity
- short sleep patterns
- self-assurance, self-confidence
- talkativeness
- risk-taking/sensation seeking
- cheerfulness and joviality
- extraversion
- expansiveness
- tirelessness

These features typically onset early in life (adolescence or early adulthood) and are relatively stable over time. In practice, hyperthymic temperament is often assessed with standardized temperament questionnaires such as the TEMPS-A, which measure it as one of the affective temperament dimensions.

== Etymology ==
The term "hyperthymia" is derived from the Ancient Greek ὑπέρ ("over", here meaning excessive) + θυμός ("spirited").

== Clinical significance ==
=== Adaptive functioning ===
Many individuals with hyperthymic temperament function well and excel in occupational and social roles. Their elevated mood and energy levels can contribute to career success and relationship stability. Hyperthymic traits such as confidence and high motivation are potentially advantageous. They are linked to a reduced risk of suicidal behavior and fewer hospitalizations among patients who develop mood disorders. Hyperthymic temperament appears to exert a protective effect against several psychiatric conditions. Individuals scoring high on hyperthymic temperament are less likely to experience unipolar depression, dysthymia, or anxiety disorders. It shows little to no comorbidity with major depression, indicating it may serve as a buffer or resilience factor against depressive illness. Among bipolar patients, hyperthymic temperament is associated with a later age of onset, milder illness course, and fewer suicide attempts, indicating a generally better prognosis. This temperament may promote greater resilience and effective coping strategies, due to the combination of high energy and a positive appraisal style.

=== Relationship with bipolar spectrum disorder ===
Hyperthymic temperament shares similarities with bipolar spectrum disorder. Individuals with hyperthymic temperament maintain an elevated mood baseline but may transition into depression or mania. If a person with hyperthymic temperament experiences a major depressive episode, their history of persistent elevated mood may indicate an underlying bipolar tendency. American psychiatrist Akiskal termed this scenario "bipolar IV" – depression superimposed on a hyperthymic temperament. In such cases, what may appear to be a consistently optimistic personality precedes the onset of mood episodes, potentially evolving into a bipolar pattern.

While hyperthymic traits are protective against unipolar depression, they do not protect against bipolar mania. Hyperthymic temperament may predispose individuals to manic or hypomanic episodes. There is a genetic association between hyperthymic temperament and bipolar I disorder, and clinically, hyperthymic features (such as impulsivity and reduced need for sleep) may precede full manic episodes.

There is also an association with substance use and risk-taking behavior – hyperthymic individuals may be more prone to substance misuse during mood episodes, reflecting their stimulus-seeking tendencies.

When individuals with hyperthymic traits become depressed, standard antidepressant medications may be problematic: due to underlying bipolar spectrum neurobiology, antidepressants alone may be ineffective or may trigger mixed features or mania. Mood stabilizers or treatments targeted toward bipolar disorder are considered more appropriate in such cases.

== Neurobiological factors ==
=== Dopaminergic influence ===
Hyperthymic temperament is associated with dysregulation in brain dopamine pathways. In particular, the mesolimbic dopamine pathway (ventral tegmental area projecting to the nucleus accumbens in the ventral striatum) and the mesocortical pathway (projections to frontal regions like the orbitofrontal cortex) are implicated. These pathways govern reward processing, motivation, and mood regulation. Neuroimaging evidence shows that reward-related circuits including frontostriatal regions such as the ventral striatum and orbitofrontal cortex tend to be more active in individuals with hyperthymic temperament. Such findings support the view that hyperthymic temperament involves dopaminergic hyper-responsivity in reward networks, although not to a pathological degree.

=== Neural connectivity patterns ===
Functional Magnetic Imaging (fMRI) study identified that Individuals with hyperthymic temperament showed distinct functional connectivity in regions such as the prefrontal cortex, anterior cingulate cortex (ACC), amygdala, thalamus, and hippocampus. These neural patterns were dissimilar from those of individuals with cyclothymic, irritable, or anxious temperaments, which tended to cluster together.

=== Reward circuit activation ===
fMRI research has found that individuals with higher hyperthymic trait levels exhibit altered activation in reward-related brain circuits. During anticipation of non-monetary rewards, people with higher hyperthymic temperament show reduced activation in the premotor cortex, whereas performance feedback elicits heightened responses in sensory-related areas proportional to their hyperthymic scores. The brains of hyperthymic individuals appear to respond more robustly to actual positive outcomes while requiring less activation during anticipatory phases. This profile may reflect differences in how positive emotions are regulated and processed in the brain.

== Genetic factors ==
Family and twin studies indicate that affective temperaments, including hyperthymia, are moderately heritable. Hyperthymic temperament in particular has an estimated heritability of 21%. Unaffected relatives of bipolar probands tend to score higher on the hyperthymic temperament scale. There are significant associations between hyperthymic temperament and loci on chromosomes 12q15 and 22q13. These loci correspond to the MDM1 gene, which is involved in nuclear protein functions and FBLN1 genes, which plays a role in extracellular matrix organization. In addition, there are associations for hyperthymic temperament with loci on chromosomes 4, 8, 20, and 6, particularly near the CDSN and PSORS1C1 genes, which are associated with neuroticism, risk-taking behavior, and schizophrenia.

== Comparison with related conditions ==
Hyperthymic temperament is characterized by a consistently elevated mood and high energy levels, distinguishing it from mood disorders within the bipolar spectrum. Unlike bipolar I and bipolar II disorders, which involve episodic mood swings between manic or hypomanic and depressive states, hyperthymia presents a stable mood without significant depressive episodes. In contrast to cyclothymic disorder, marked by frequent shifts between mild depressive and hypomanic symptoms, hyperthymic individuals maintain a persistently elevated mood with minimal fluctuation. While hypomania shares features with hyperthymia, such as elevated mood and increased activity, hypomania is episodic and represents a noticeable change from an individual's typical behavior, whereas hyperthymic temperament is a lifelong, stable trait. Additionally, hyperthymic temperament differs from euthymia, the state of a normal, stable mood, by consistently exhibiting higher-than-average positivity and energy levels.

== See also ==
- Cyclothymia
- Dysthymia
- Schizothymia
