= Mauricio Tohen =

Mexican American research psychiatrist

Mauricio Tohen is a Mexican American research psychiatrist, Distinguished Professor, and Chairman of the Department of Psychiatry & Behavioral Sciences at the University of New Mexico. Tohen's research has focused on the epidemiology, outcome, and treatment of bipolar and psychotic disorders, and is especially known for innovating the design of clinical trials and the criteria to determine outcome in such diseases. Tohen has edited several books on his specialties. His social awareness has been noted in the promotion of programs to improve mental health care in areas such as substance abuse, bipolar disorder and schizophrenia.

== Education ==
Tohen graduated as an MD from the National Autonomous University of Mexico, Mexico City in 1976. He trained in Psychiatry at the University of Toronto where he also obtained a DPsych Diploma in Psychiatric Research (1979–1982). He then pursued a fellowship in Psychopharmacology (1982–1985) at McLean Hospital, Harvard Medical School, followed by a Doctorate in public health (epidemiology) completed in 1988 at Harvard School of Public Health. In 2000, Tohen also obtained an MBA degree from the Kelley School of Business, Indiana University.

== Career ==
Tohen´s career has developed both in academia and industry.

=== Academia ===
Tohen spent the first decade of his academic career (1999–2009) at Harvard where he was 1) Associate Professor of Epidemiology at Harvard School of Public Health, teaching Psychiatric Epidemiology, 2) Clinical Director of the Bipolar and Psychotic Disorders Program at McLean Hospital, conducting research on bipolar disorder and first-episode psychosis, and 3) AssociateProfessor of Psychiatry at Harvard Medical School.

Tohen worked at the University of Texas Health Science Center at San Antonio, at the Department of Psychiatry where he occupied positions as Division Head of Mood & Anxiety Disorders, Aaron & Bobbie Elliott Krus Endowed Chair, and tenured Professor.

Since 2013, Tohen has been a Professor and Chairman of the Department of Psychiatry & Behavioral Sciences at The University of New Mexico, Health Sciences Center (Albuquerque, NM), where in 2020 he was promoted to the category of Distinguished Professor.

=== Industry ===
From 1997 to 2012, Tohen joined Lilly Research Laboratories in Indianapolis, where he reached the position of Distinguished Lilly Scholar. Based on his leadership and clinical trial design, the company obtained the indication for Olanzapine for the treatment of Acute Mania and relapse prevention from the FDA and the European CPMP, as well as the indication for bipolar depression for fluoxetine/olanzapine combination from the FDA, and the indication of Olanzapine for acute mania and bipolar depression from the PMDA in Japan.

== Research ==
Tohen has authored over 380 original publications with over 40,000 scientific citations. His most cited papers include:

- Hegarty, J. D.; Baldessarini, R. J.; Tohen, M.; Waternaux, C.; Oepen, G. (October 1994). "One hundred years of schizophrenia: a meta-analysis of the outcome literature". The American Journal of Psychiatry. 151 (10): 1409–1416. doi:10.1176/ajp.151.10.1409. ISSN 0002-953X. PMID 8092334.
- Tohen, M.; Sanger, T. M.; McElroy, S. L.; Tollefson, G. D.; Chengappa, K. N.; Daniel, D. G.; Petty, F.; Centorrino, F.; Wang, R.; Grundy, S. L.; Greaney, M. G. (May 1999). "Olanzapine versus placebo in the treatment of acute mania. Olanzapine HGEH Study Group". The American Journal of Psychiatry. 156 (5): 702–709. doi:10.1176/ajp.156.5.702. ISSN 0002-953X. PMID 10327902.
- Tohen, Mauricio; Vieta, Eduard; Calabrese, Joseph; Ketter, Terence A.; Sachs, Gary; Bowden, Charles; Mitchell, Philip B.; Centorrino, Franca; Risser, Richard; Baker, Robert W.; Evans, Angela R. (2003-11). "Efficacy of olanzapine and olanzapine-fluoxetine combination in the treatment of bipolar I depression". Archives of General Psychiatry. 60 (11): 1079–1088. doi:10.1001/archpsyc.60.11.1079. ISSN 0003-990X. PMID 14609883
- Tohen, M.; Jacobs, T. G.; Grundy, S. L.; McElroy, S. L.; Banov, M. C.; Janicak, P. G.; Sanger, T.; Risser, R.; Zhang, F.; Toma, V.; Francis, J. (2000-09). "Efficacy of olanzapine in acute bipolar mania: a double-blind, placebo-controlled study. The Olanzipine HGGW Study Group". Archives of General Psychiatry. 57 (9): 841–849. doi:10.1001/archpsyc.57.9.841. ISSN 0003-990X. PMID 10986547

=== Research topics ===
Research articles where Tohen is an author will be found in current entries on Antipsychotic, Associated features of bipolar disorder, Atypical antipsychotic, Bipolar disorder, Bipolar I disorder, Cariprazine, Clinical trial, Early intervention in psychosis, Lurasidone, Mental disorder, Mixed affective state, Olanzapine, Schizophrenia, and Treatment of bipolar disorder.

== Honors ==
Tohen has been President of the International Society for Bipolar Disorders (2010–2012) and President of the American Society of Hispanic Psychiatry (2014–2016). In 2016 he was selected by the National Alliance on Mental Illness to receive the Exemplary Psychiatrist Award. Also in 2016, the International Society for Bipolar Disorders awarded him the Mogens Schou Award for Education and Teaching. Other honors he has received include a FIRST award from NIMH, the Pope Award from McLean Hospital, a NARSAD Young Investigator Award, and in 2011 the Simon Bolivar Award from the American Psychiatric Association.

Tohen was listed by Thomson Reuters among The World's Most Influential Scientific Minds 2014 in Psychiatry/Psychology, based on citation data of scientists who published work with the highest (top 1%) impact in their fields between 2002 and 2013. His Expertise in Bipolar Disorder is ranked by Expertscape as Top 0.14% worldwide, based on his articles on the topic published from 2010 through 2020.

== Books ==
Tohen has co-edited four books:

- Textbook of Psychiatric Epidemiology (1995 first edition, 2002 second edition & 2011 third edition)
- Mood Disorders Across the Life Span (1996)
- Bipolar Disorder:The Upswing in Research and Treatment (2005)
- Bipolar Psychopharmacotherapy: Caring for the Patient, first edition (2006), second edition (2011)

He also edited two books:

- Bipolar Disorder: Comorbidity in Affective Disorders (1999)
- Clinical Trial Design Challenges in Mood Disorders (2015), first edition
