= Associated features of bipolar disorder =

Clinical phenomena that often accompany bipolar disorder

The associated features of bipolar disorder are clinical phenomena that often accompany bipolar disorder (BD) but are not part of the diagnostic criteria for the disorder. There are several childhood precursors in children who later receive a diagnosis of bipolar disorder. They may show subtle early traits such as mood abnormalities, full major depressive episodes, and attention-deficit hyperactivity disorder. BD is also accompanied by changes in cognition processes and abilities. This includes reduced attentional and executive capabilities and impaired memory. How the individual processes the world also depends on the phase of the disorder, with differential characteristics between the manic, hypomanic and depressive states. Some studies have found a significant association between bipolar disorder and creativity.

== Childhood precursors ==
Some limited long-term studies indicate that children who later receive a diagnosis of bipolar disorder may show subtle early traits such as subthreshold cyclical mood abnormalities, full major depressive episodes, and possibly ADHD with mood fluctuation. There may be hypersensitivity and irritability. There is some disagreement whether the experiences are necessarily fluctuating or may be chronic. Having parents with bipolar disorder is associated with increased risk of psychiatric disorders.

There is limited research on the association between stimulant treatment and presentation of manic symptoms. In a study of 34 adolescents hospitalized with mania, there was an association between earlier age of onset and previous stimulant use, independent of ADHD. In a retrospective study of 80 adolescents hospitalized with bipolar disorder, 35% of patients had previously used stimulants and 44% had used antidepressants, where stimulant use was associated with worse hospitalization course. However, there is mixed research on these relationships. A study conducted in 2008 of 245 bipolar adolescents found neither earlier age of onset nor severity of bipolar symptoms were associated with prior stimulant treatment.

== Cognitive functioning ==
Reviews have indicated that most individuals diagnosed with bipolar disorder, but who are euthymic (not experiencing major depression or mania), do not show neuropsychological deficits on most tests. Meta-analyses have indicated, by averaging the variable findings of many studies, cognitive deficits on some measures of sustained attention, executive function and verbal memory, in terms of group averages. On some tests, functioning is superior; however, and sub-threshold mood states and psychiatric medications may account for some deficits. A 2010 study found that "excellent performance" at school at age 15–16 was associated in males with a higher rate of developing bipolar disorder, but so was the poorest performance. A 2005 study of young adult males found that poor performance on visuospatial tasks was associated with a higher rate of developing bipolar disorder, but so was high performance in arithmetic reasoning.

Psychological studies of bipolar disorder have examined the development of a wide range of both the core symptoms of psychomotor activation and related clusterings of depression/anxiety, increased hedonic tone, irritability/aggression and sometimes psychosis. The existing evidence has been described as patchy in terms of quality but converging in a consistent manner. The findings suggest that the period leading up to mania is often characterized by depression and anxiety at first, with isolated sub-clinical symptoms of mania such as increased energy and racing thoughts. The latter increase and lead to increased activity levels, the more so if there is disruption in circadian rhythms or goal attainment events. There is some indication that once mania has begun to develop, social stressors, including criticism from significant others, can further contribute. There are also indications that individuals may hold certain beliefs about themselves, their internal states, and their social world (including striving to meet high standards despite it causing distress) that may make them vulnerable during changing mood states in the face of relevant life events. In addition, subtle frontal-temporal and subcortical difficulties in some individuals, related to planning, emotional regulation and attentional control, may play a role. Symptoms are often subthreshold and likely continuous with normal experience. Once (hypo)mania has developed, there is an overall increase in activation levels and impulsivity. Negative social reactions or advice may be taken less notice of, and a person may be more caught up in their own thoughts and interpretations, often along a theme of feeling criticised. There is some suggestion that the mood variation in bipolar disorder may not be cyclical as often assumed, nor completely random, but results from a complex interaction between internal and external variables unfolding over time; there is mixed evidence as to whether relevant life events are found more often in early than later episodes. Many with the condition report inexplicably varied cyclical patterns, however.

A series of authors have described mania or hypomania as being related to a high motivation to achieve, ambitious goal-setting, and sometimes high achievement. One study indicated that the pursuit of goals, encouraged by sometimes achieving them, can become emotionally dysregulated and involve the development of mania. Individuals may have low self-esteem and difficulties in social adjustment.

Bipolar disorder has been associated with people involved in the arts but it is an ongoing question as to whether many creative geniuses had bipolar disorder. Some studies have found a significant association between bipolar disorder and creativity, although it is unclear in which direction the cause lies or whether both conditions are caused by a third unknown factor; temperament has been hypothesized to be one such factor. The individual's attachment to heightened creativity during hypomanic episodes may contribute to ambivalence about seeking treatment or undermine adherence to treatment.

== Substance use ==
Often bipolar individuals are subject to self-medication with non-prescribed drugs such as alcohol, tobacco and other recreational drugs.

There is some evidence that the subset of bipolar patients with a history of psychosis may smoke more heavily than the general population.

== See also ==
- Outline of bipolar disorder
