= Thumos =

Ancient Greek concept of spiritedness

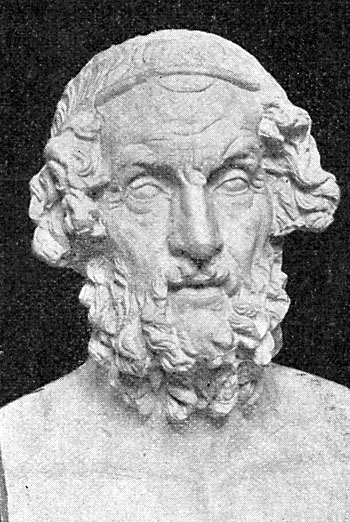
Homer. Marble bust in the British Museum, London.

Thumos, also spelled thymos (Ancient Greek: θυμός), is the Ancient Greek concept of 'spiritedness' (as in "a spirited stallion" or "spirited debate"). The word indicates a physical association with breath or blood and is also used to express the human desire for recognition. It is not a somatic feeling, as nausea and dizziness are.

== History ==
=== Homer ===
In Homer's works, thumos was used to denote emotions, desire, or an internal urge. Thumos was a permanent possession of living man, to which his thinking and feeling belonged. When a Homeric hero is under emotional stress, he may externalize his thumos and converse with or scold it. Achilles, in the Iliad, cares for his own honour; he keeps gods and deities in his heart; "...the thunderous lord of Hera might grant you the winning of glory, you must not set your mind on fighting the Trojans, whose delight is in battle, without me. So you will diminish my honour (thumos)."

=== Democritus ===
Democritus used "euthymia" (i.e. "good thumos") to refer to a condition in which the soul lives calmly and steadily, being disturbed by no fear, superstition, or other passions. For Democritus, euthymia was one of the root aspects of the goal of human life.

=== Plato ===
Plato's Phaedrus and his later work The Republic discuss thumos as one of the three constituent parts of the human psyche. In the Phaedrus, Plato depicts logos as a charioteer driving the two horses eros and thumos (erotic love and spiritedness are to be guided by logos). In the Republic (Book IV) soul becomes divided into (See Plato's tripartite theory of soul):

- nous ("intellect", "reason"), which is or should be the controlling part which subjugates the appetites with the help of thumos.
- thumos ("passion"), the emotional element in virtue of which we feel joy, amusement, etc. (the Republic IV, 439e);
- epithumia ("appetite", "affection"), to which are ascribed bodily desires;

Plato suggested we have three parts of our soul, which in combination makes us better in our destined vocation, and is a hidden basis for developing our innate ideas. Thumos may draw from this to strengthen man with our reasoning, this tripartite division is as follows:

1. Reason (thoughts, reflections, questioning)
2. Spiritedness (ego, glory, honor) and
3. Desires (natural e.g. food, drink, sex vs unnatural e.g. money, power).

== Contemporary views ==
=== Thymos and democracy: megalothymia and isothymia ===
"Megalothymia" refers to the need to be recognized as superior to others, while "isothymia" is the need to be recognized as merely equal to others. Both terms are neoclassical compounds, coined by Francis Fukuyama. In his book The End of History and the Last Man, Fukuyama mentions "thymos" in relation to liberal democracy and recognition. He relates Socrates' ideas about Thymos and desire to how people want to be recognized within their government. Problems emerge when other people do not recognize another's Thymos, and therefore do not provide the justice that it requires. In order for people to exist in harmony, Fukuyama argues, isothymia rather than megalothymia must be used to satisfy the human need for recognition. Any system that creates political inequality is necessarily feeding the megalothymia of some members while denying it to others. Fukuyama explains how Thymos relates to history with the example of anti-communism in relation to the Soviet Union, Eastern Europe, and China. He states, "We cannot understand the totality of the revolutionary phenomenon unless we appreciate the working of thymotic anger and the demand for recognition that accompanied communism's economic crisis."

=== In medicine ===
Hyperthymia, dysthymia, cyclothymia, and euthymia (medicine) are mental/behavioral conditions in modern psychology, while alexithymia studied in neuropsychology.

=== Cultural references ===
- In Miguel de Cervantes's Don Quixote the knight has been described as driven by a spirited thymos or anger when his sense of self-worth is denigrated. He only recovers balance, a sense of justice, when he comes to abide among the Saracens.
- The Phi Theta Kappa honor society took the letter theta for thumos, representing the "aspiration" that they seek in their potential members.
- Thymos is the name of an academic Journal of Boyhood Studies .
- Thumos is the name of an American progressive doom/post-metal band whose music is based on the works of Plato .

== See also ==
- Amour-propre
- Will to power
