= Mania =

Mood disorder

- Other names: Manic syndrome, manic episode
- Specialty: Psychiatry, emergency medicine
- Symptoms: Euphoria or dysphoria; grandiosity; irritability; decreased need for sleep; flight of ideas; pressured speech; hyperactivity; distractibility; emotional lability; disinhibition; aggression; impulsivity
- Complications: Psychosis; delirium; catatonia; hypersexuality; harm to self or others; subsequent depression
- Causes: Bipolar disorder; schizoaffective disorder; postpartum psychosis; certain medications; multiple sclerosis
- Differential diagnosis: Hypomania; hyperthyroidism; schizophrenia; substance intoxication
- Medication: Mood stabilizers; antipsychotics

Mania (/ˈmeɪniːə/ MAY-nee-ə; also known as manic syndrome) is a psychiatric behavioral syndrome defined as a state of abnormally elevated mood with hyperactivity and risky behavior. During a manic episode, an individual will experience rapidly changing emotions and moods, highly influenced by surrounding stimuli. Although mania is often conceived of as a "mirror image" to depression, as in the naming of bipolar disorder, the heightened mood of mania can be euphoric as well as dysphoric.

The symptoms of mania include elevated mood (either euphoric or irritable), flight of ideas, pressure of speech, increased energy, decreased need for sleep, and hyperactivity. Persistent irritability is a symptom of both mania and depression. In severe manic episodes (characteristic of bipolar I disorder), psychotic symptoms may manifest, including delusions (such as grandiose delusions and paranoid delusions) or hallucinations. The prevalence of psychosis in manic episodes is 57%; the rate in depressive episodes is 13%. Other psychotic symptoms include fragmentation of behavior and catatonia. For context, the rate of schizophrenia in bipolar disorder is 8%. More than 5% of the general human population has experienced mania or hypomania in some degree.

== Classification ==
=== Mixed states ===
In a mixed affective state, the individual, though meeting the general criteria for a hypomanic (discussed below) or manic episode, experiences three or more concurrent depressive symptoms. This has caused some speculation, among clinicians, that mania and depression, rather than constituting "true" polar opposites, are, rather, two independent axes in a unipolar—bipolar spectrum.

A mixed affective state, especially with prominent manic symptoms, places the patient at a greater risk for suicide. Depression on its own is a risk factor but, when coupled with an increase in energy and goal-directed activity, the patient is far more likely to act on suicidal impulses.

=== Hypomania ===
Hypomania, which means "less than mania", is a lowered state of mania that does not always impair function or decrease quality of life. Although creativity and hypomania have been historically linked, a review and meta-analysis exploring this relationship found that this assumption may be too general and empirical research evidence is lacking.

In hypomania, there is less need for sleep and both goal-motivated behaviour and metabolism increase. Some studies exploring brain metabolism in subjects with hypomania, however, did not find any conclusive link; while there are studies that reported abnormalities, others failed to detect differences. Though the elevated mood and energy level typical of hypomania could be seen positively, mania itself generally has many undesirable consequences, including suicidal tendencies. Hypomania can also have these effects, if the prominent mood is irritable as opposed to euphoric. In addition, the intense cases of hypomania can lead to problems. Where trait-based positivity for a person could make them more engaging, outgoing, and cause them to have a positive outlook in life, exaggerated in hypomania, such a person can display excessive optimism, grandiosity, and poor decision-making, often with little regard to the consequences.

=== Associated disorders ===
A single manic episode, in the absence of secondary causes, (i.e., substance use disorders, certain medications, or general medical conditions) is often sufficient to diagnose bipolar I disorder. Hypomania may be indicative of bipolar II disorder. Manic episodes are often complicated by delusions and/or hallucinations; and if the psychotic features persist for a duration significantly longer than the episode of typical mania (two weeks or more), a diagnosis of schizoaffective disorder is more appropriate.

Hyperthyroidism can produce similar symptoms to those of mania, such as agitation, elevated mood, increased energy, hyperactivity, sleep disturbances and sometimes, especially in severe cases, psychosis. Postpartum psychosis can also cause manic episodes (unipolar mania).

== Signs and symptoms ==
A manic episode is defined in the American Psychiatric Association's diagnostic manual (DSM) as a "distinct period of abnormally and persistently elevated, expansive, or irritable mood and abnormally and persistently increased activity or energy, lasting at least 1 week and present most of the day, nearly every day (or any duration, if hospitalization is necessary)".

The World Health Organization defines a manic episode as one where "a person experiences an extremely high mood". Other symptoms include hyperactivity, a compulsion to speak, "decreased need for sleep", difficulty sustaining attention, grandiose beliefs, or increased distractibility.

Some people also have physical symptoms, such as sweating, pacing, and weight loss. In full-blown mania, often the manic person will feel as though their goal(s) are of paramount importance, that there are no consequences, or that negative consequences would be minimal, and that they need not exercise restraint in the pursuit of what they are after. Hypomania is different, as it may cause little or no impairment in function. The hypomanic person's connection with the external world, and its standards of interaction, remain intact, although intensity of moods is heightened. But those with prolonged unresolved hypomania do run the risk of developing full mania, and may do so without even realizing they have.

One of the signature symptoms of mania (and to a lesser extent, hypomania) is what many have described as racing thoughts. These are usually instances in which the manic person is excessively distracted by objectively unimportant stimuli. This experience creates an absent-mindedness where the manic individual's thoughts totally preoccupy them, making them unable to keep track of time, or be aware of anything besides the flow of thoughts. Racing thoughts also interfere with the ability to fall asleep.

Manic states are always relative to the normal state of intensity of the affected individual; thus, already irritable patients may find themselves losing their tempers even more quickly, and an academically gifted person may, during the hypomanic stage, adopt seemingly "genius" characteristics and an ability to perform and articulate at a level far beyond that which they would be capable of during euthymia. A very simple indicator of a manic state would be if a thus far clinically depressed patient suddenly becomes inordinately energetic, enthusiastic, cheerful, aggressive, or "over-happy".

Other, often less obvious, elements of mania include delusions (generally of either grandeur or persecution, according to whether the predominant mood is euphoric or irritable), hypersensitivity, hypervigilance, hypersexuality, hyper-religiosity, hyperactivity and impulsivity, a compulsion to over explain (typically accompanied by pressure of speech), grandiose schemes and ideas, and a decreased need for sleep (for example, feeling rested after only 3 or 4 hours of sleep). In the case of the latter, the eyes of such patients may both look and seem abnormally "wide open", rarely blinking, and may contribute to some clinicians' erroneous belief that these patients are under the influence of a stimulant drug, when the patient, in fact, is either not on any mind-altering substances or is actually on a depressant drug.

Individuals may also engage in out-of-character behavior during the episode, such as questionable business transactions, wasteful expenditures of money (e.g., spending sprees), risky sexual activity, abuse of recreational substances, excessive gambling, reckless behavior (such as extreme speeding or other daredevil activity), abnormal social interaction (e.g., over-familiarity and conversing with strangers), or highly vocal arguments. These behaviours may increase stress in personal relationships, lead to problems at work, and increase the risk of altercations with law enforcement. There is a high risk of impulsively taking part in activities potentially harmful to the self and others.

The experience of mania is often quite unpleasant and sometimes frightening, for the person involved and for those close to them, and it may lead to impulsive behaviour that may later be regretted. It can also often be complicated by the individual's lack of judgment and insight regarding periods of exacerbation of characteristic states. Manic patients may frequently deny anything is wrong with them. Because mania frequently encourages high energy and decreased perception of need or ability to sleep, within a few days of a manic cycle, sleep-deprived psychosis may appear, further complicating the ability to think clearly.

Mania may also, as earlier mentioned, be divided into three "stages". Stage I corresponds with hypomania and may feature typical hypomanic characteristics, such as hypersociality and euphoria. In stages II and III mania, however, the patient may be extraordinarily irritable, psychotic or even delirious. These latter two stages are referred to as acute and delirious (or Bell's), respectively.

== Causes ==
Various triggers have been associated with switching from euthymic or depressed states into mania. One common trigger of mania is antidepressant therapy. Studies give widely varying estimates of the switching while on an antidepressant, with tricyclic antidepressants generally showing higher risk. Dopaminergic drugs such as reuptake inhibitors and dopamine agonists may also increase risk of switch. Other medications possibly include glutaminergic agents and drugs that alter the HPA axis. Lifestyle triggers include irregular sleep-wake schedules and sleep deprivation, as well as extremely emotional or stressful stimuli.

Various genes that have been implicated in genetic studies of bipolar have been manipulated in preclinical animal models to produce syndromes reflecting different aspects of mania. CLOCK and DBP polymorphisms have been linked to bipolar in population studies, and behavioral changes induced by knockout are reversed by lithium treatment. Metabotropic glutamate receptor 6 has been genetically linked to bipolar, and found to be under-expressed in the cortex. Pituitary adenylate cyclase-activating peptide has been associated with bipolar in gene linkage studies, and knockout in mice produces mania like-behavior. Targets of various treatments such as GSK-3, and ERK1 have also demonstrated mania like behavior in preclinical models.

Mania may be associated with strokes, especially cerebral lesions in the right hemisphere.

Deep brain stimulation of the subthalamic nucleus in Parkinson's disease has been associated with mania, especially with electrodes placed in the ventromedial STN. A proposed mechanism involves increased excitatory input from the STN to dopaminergic nuclei.

Mania can also be caused by physical trauma or illness. When the causes are physical, it is called secondary mania. In some individuals, manic symptoms are also correlated with the season of spring.

In "bipolar I or genetically vulnerable individuals", non-clinical use of psychedelics elevates risk for mania.

== Mechanism ==
The mechanism underlying mania is unknown, but the neurocognitive profile of mania is highly consistent with dysfunction in the right prefrontal cortex, a common finding in neuroimaging studies. Various lines of evidence from post-mortem studies and the putative mechanisms of anti-manic agents point to abnormalities in GSK-3, dopamine, Protein kinase C, and Inositol monophosphatase.

Meta analysis of neuroimaging studies demonstrate increased thalamic activity, and bilaterally reduced inferior frontal gyrus activation. Activity in the amygdala and other subcortical structures such as the ventral striatum tend to be increased, although results are inconsistent and likely dependent upon task characteristics such as valence. Reduced functional connectivity between the ventral prefrontal cortex and amygdala along with variable findings supports a hypothesis of general dysregulation of subcortical structures by the prefrontal cortex. A bias towards positively valenced stimuli, and increased responsiveness in reward circuitry may predispose towards mania. Mania tends to be associated with right hemisphere lesions, while depression tends to be associated with left hemisphere lesions.

Post-mortem examinations of bipolar disorder demonstrate increased expression of Protein Kinase C (PKC). While limited, some studies demonstrate manipulation of PKC in animals produces behavioral changes mirroring mania, and treatment with PKC inhibitor tamoxifen (also an anti-estrogen drug) demonstrates antimanic effects. Traditional antimanic drugs also demonstrate PKC inhibiting properties, among other effects such as GSK3 inhibition.

Manic episodes may be triggered by dopamine receptor agonists, and this combined with tentative reports of increased VMAT2 activity, measured via PET scans of radioligand binding, suggests a role of dopamine in mania. Decreased cerebrospinal fluid levels of the serotonin metabolite 5-HIAA have been found in manic patients too, which may be explained by a failure of serotonergic regulation and dopaminergic hyperactivity.

Limited evidence suggests that mania is associated with behavioral reward hypersensitivity, as well as with neural reward hypersensitivity. Electrophysiological evidence supporting this comes from studies associating left frontal EEG activity with mania. As left frontal EEG activity is generally thought to be a reflection of behavioral activation system activity, this is thought to support a role for reward hypersensitivity in mania. Tentative evidence also comes from one study that reported an association between manic traits and feedback negativity during receipt of monetary reward or loss.

Neuroimaging evidence during acute mania is sparse, but one study reported elevated orbitofrontal cortex activity to monetary reward, and another study reported elevated striatal activity to reward omission. The latter finding was interpreted in the context of either elevated baseline activity (resulting in a null finding of reward hypersensitivity), or reduced ability to discriminate between reward and punishment, still supporting reward hyperactivity in mania. Punishment hyposensitivity, as reflected in a number of neuroimaging studies as reduced lateral orbitofrontal response to punishment, has been proposed as a mechanism of reward hypersensitivity in mania.

== Diagnosis ==
=== Differential diagnosis ===
Before beginning treatment for mania, careful differential diagnosis must be performed to rule out other conditions. Conditions whose symptoms may resemble mania include substance use, various physical conditions such as hyperthyroidism, and various mental health conditions such as "severe anxiety" or "major depressive disorder with psychotic features".

== Treatment ==
=== Debate over decision-making capacity ===
Writing a chapter for the Clinical Textbook of Mood Disorders, Jauhar and Wong (2024) assert that acute mania is a medical emergency. It is currently debated in the Journal of Medical Ethics whether (or to what extent) patients with acute mania have the capacity to make their own medical decisions. At most, 75% of psychiatric patients (e.g. patients with schizophrenia or bipolar disorder), "may have capacity to make medical decisions in the context of their illness".

From the United Nations Handbook for Parliamentarians on the Convention on the Rights of Persons with Disabilities:

When individuals lack the legal capacity to act, they are not only robbed of their right to equal recognition before the law, they are also robbed of their ability to defend and enjoy other human rights. Guardians and tutors acting on behalf of persons with disabilities sometimes fail to act in the interests of the individual they are representing; worse, they sometimes abuse their positions of authority, violating the rights of others. Article 12 of the Convention recognizes that persons with disabilities have legal capacity on an equal basis with others. In other words, an individual cannot lose his/her legal capacity to act simply because of a disability. (However, legal capacity can still be lost in situations that apply to everyone, such as if someone is convicted of a crime.)

=== Treating and preventing mood episodes ===
The acute treatment of a manic episode of bipolar disorder involves the utilization of either a mood stabilizer (e.g., carbamazepine, valproate, lithium, or lamotrigine) or an atypical antipsychotic (e.g., olanzapine, quetiapine, asenapine, risperidone, aripiprazole, or cariprazine). In 2024, iloperidone was approved by the FDA for the acute treatment of manic episodes related to bipolar I disorder. The use of antipsychotic agents in the treatment of acute mania was reviewed by Tohen and Vieta in 2009.

In some cases, long-acting benzodiazepines, particularly clonazepam, are used after other options are exhausted. Out of six randomized controlled trials of clonazepam for treatment of acute mania, over half of these studies were at "high risk of bias" related to blinding and "incomplete outcome data". Authors Lappas and co-workers call for "more and larger studies."

In more urgent circumstances, such as in emergency rooms, lorazepam, combined with haloperidol, is used to promptly alleviate symptoms of agitation, aggression, and psychosis.

As of 2023, long-term treatment focuses on prophylactic treatment to try to stabilize the patient's mood, typically through a combination of pharmacotherapy and psychotherapy. While medication for bipolar disorder can help to manage symptoms of mania and depression, studies show relying on medications alone is not the most effective method of treatment. Medication is most effective when used in combination with other bipolar disorder treatments, including psychotherapy, self-help coping strategies, and healthy lifestyle choices.

Sources differ on how clinicians should handle patients who do not take medication. Jawad and others (2018) recommend that clinicians regularly evaluate adherence and pursue strategies to increase adherence such as, "shared decision-making, psychoeducation with a clear focus on adherence, [...]". In contrast, Cappleman, Smith, and Lobban (2015) do not emphasize adherence. Instead, they encourage professionals to pursue other treatment methods when patients "do not use medication". A 2021 meta-analysis found that mood stabilizers decreased (by 55%) the six-month relative risk of mania, hypomania, or mixed mood state. At the same time, "47.3% of patients who discontinued drugs for 6 months did not experience recurrence ['of any mood episode']."

Lithium is the classic mood stabilizer to prevent further manic and depressive episodes. A systematic review found that long term lithium treatment reduces the relative risk of bipolar manic relapse by 38%, "relative risk=0.62". Anticonvulsants such as valproate, oxcarbazepine, and carbamazepine are also used for prophylaxis; more recent drug solutions include lamotrigine and topiramate, both anticonvulsants as well.

=== Contraindication of antidepressants ===
Antidepressant monotherapy is not recommended for the treatment of depression in patients with bipolar disorders I or II, and no benefit has been demonstrated by combining antidepressants with mood stabilizers in these patients. Some atypical antidepressants, however, such as mirtazapine and trazodone, have been occasionally used after other options have failed.

== Society and culture ==
In Electroboy: A Memoir of Mania by Andy Behrman, he describes his experience of mania as "the most perfect prescription glasses with which to see the world... life appears in front of you like an oversized movie screen." Behrman indicates early in his memoir that he sees himself not as a person with an uncontrollable disabling illness, but as a director of the movie that is his vivid and emotionally alive life. There is some evidence that there is a higher prevalence of bipolar disorder among people in the creative industries than in other occupations. Winston Churchill had periods of manic symptoms that may have been both an asset and a liability.

English actor Stephen Fry, who has bipolar disorder, recounts manic behaviour during his adolescence: "When I was about 17 ... going around London on two stolen credit cards, it was a sort of fantastic reinvention of myself, an attempt to. I bought ridiculous suits with stiff collars and silk ties from the 1920s, and would go to the Savoy and Ritz and drink cocktails." While he has experienced suicidal thoughts, he says the manic side of his condition has provided positive contributions in his life.

== Etymology ==
The nosology of the various stages of a manic episode has changed over the decades. The word derives from the Ancient Greek μανία (manía), "madness, frenzy" and the verb μαίνομαι (maínomai), "to be mad, to rage, to be furious."

== See also ==
- Antibiomania
- Cyclothymia
- Hyperthymic temperament
- Monomania
- Dancing mania
- Paranoia
- Abnormal psychology
