= Cyclothymia =

Mental disorder

- Other names: Cyclothymic disorder, psychothemia, psychothymia, bipolar III, affective personality disorder, cyclothymic personality disorder
- Specialty: Psychiatry, clinical psychology
- Symptoms: Periods of depressive and hypomanic symptoms
- Complications: Risk of self-harm
- Causes: Unknown
- Risk factors: Family history
- Differential diagnosis: Bipolar disorder, borderline personality disorder, substance misuse disorder
- Treatment: Psychotherapy, medications
- Frequency: 0.4–1% at some point in life

Cyclothymia (/ˌsaɪkləˈθaɪmiə/, siy-kluh-THIY-mee-uh), also known as cyclothymic disorder, psychothemia / psychothymia, bipolar III, affective personality disorder and cyclothymic personality disorder, is a mental and behavioural disorder that involves recurring periods of depressive and hypomanic symptoms. The depressive symptoms, however, are insufficient to constitute a major depressive episode. Depending on the diagnostic criteria used, the periods of hypomanic symptoms may or may not meet the criteria for full hypomanic episodes. Symptoms must last for more than one year in children and two years in adults.

The cause of cyclothymia is unknown. Risk factors include a family history of bipolar disorder.

Treatment is generally achieved with counseling and mood stabilizers such as lithium. It is estimated that 0.4–1% of people have cyclothymia at some point in their lives. The disorder's onset typically occurs in late childhood to early adulthood. Males and females are affected equally often.

== Signs and symptoms ==
People with cyclothymia experience both depressive phases and hypomanic phases (which are less severe than major depressive or hypomanic episodes). The depressive and hypomanic symptoms in cyclothymia last for variable amounts of time due to the unstable and reactive nature of the disorder. The depressive phases are similar to major depressive disorder and are characterized by dulled thoughts and sensations and the lack of motivation for intellectual or social activities. Most people with cyclothymia are generally fatigued and tend to sleep frequently and for long periods. However, other people experience insomnia.

Other symptoms of cyclothymic depression include indifference toward people or activities that used to be extremely important. Cyclothymic depression also leads to difficulty making decisions. In addition, people with this condition tend to be critical and complain easily. Suicidal thoughts are common, even in mild forms of cyclothymia. In the depressive state, people with cyclothymia also experience physical complaints, including frequent headaches, tightness in the head and chest, an empty sensation in the head, weakness, weight loss, and hair loss.

The distinguishing factor between typical depression and cyclothymic depression is that in cyclothymic depression, there are instances of hypomania. People with cyclothymia can switch from the depressive state to the hypomanic state without warning to themselves or others. The duration and frequency of phases are unpredictable.

In the hypomanic state, people's thoughts become faster, and they become more sociable and talkative. They may engage in spending sprees, spontaneous actions, have heightened self-esteem, and greater vanity. In contrast to a regular manic state that would be associated with bipolar I, symptoms in the hypomanic phase generally occur in a less severe form.

Cyclothymia commonly occurs in conjunction with other disorders. Between 20 and 50 percent of people with depression, anxiety, and related disorders also have cyclothymia. When people with cyclothymia seek mental health resources, it tends to be for symptoms of their comorbid condition rather than for their symptoms of cyclothymia. In children and adolescents, the most common comorbidities with cyclothymia are anxiety disorders, impulse control issues, eating disorders, and ADHD. In adults, cyclothymia also tends to be comorbid with impulse control issues. Sensation-seeking behaviors occur in hypomanic states.

In addition to sensation-related disorders, cyclothymia has also been associated with atypical depression. In one study, a connection was found between interpersonal sensitivity, mood reactivity (i.e., responding to actual or potential positive events with brighter mood), and cyclothymic mood swings, all of which are symptoms of atypical depression. Cyclothymia also tends to occur in conjunction with separation anxiety, where a person has anxiety as a result of separation from a caregiver, friend, or loved one. Other issues that tend to co-occur with cyclothymia include social anxiety, fear of rejection and a tendency toward hostility to those connected with past pain and rejection. People with cyclothymia tend to seek intense interpersonal relationships when in a hypomanic state and isolation when in a depressed state. This generally leads to short, tumultuous relationships.

== Causes ==
The cause is unknown. Risk factors include a family history of bipolar disorder.

First-degree relatives of people with cyclothymia have major depressive disorder, bipolar I disorder, and bipolar II disorder more often than the general population. Substance-related disorders may also be at a higher risk within the family. First-degree relatives of a bipolar I individual may have a higher risk of cyclothymic disorder than the general population.

== Diagnosis ==
In the DSM-5, cyclothymia is conceptualized as cyclothymic disorder and is classified under "Bipolar and Related Disorders". The criteria are:

1. Numerous periods of hypomanic and depressive symptoms that do not meet the criteria for a hypomanic or major depressive episode, occurring over at least two years in adults or one year in children and adolescents.
2. Periods of subthreshold hypomanic and depressive symptoms are present for at least half of the above period, with no symptom-free interval lasting more than two months.
3. Hypomanic or depressive symptoms do not meet the criteria for hypomanic, manic, or depressive episodes.
4. Symptoms are not better explained by schizophrenia and related psychotic disorders.
5. Symptoms are not caused by substance use or a medical condition.
6. Symptoms create significant problems in one or more areas of life.

The ICD-11 criteria is similar but permits the initial diagnosis of cyclothymic disorder if hypomania occurs alternating with sub-threshold depressive symptoms, but not full clinical depression. Additionally, the ICD-11 upholds the diagnosis of cyclothymia if major depressive disorder is diagnosed after criteria for cyclothymia without full hypomania is met (in which case, the diagnoses co-exist), whereas the DSM-5 drops the diagnosis of cyclothymia in favor of major depressive disorder. Both the DSM-5 and ICD-11 replace the diagnosis with bipolar I if a manic episode occurs.

DSM-5 and ICD-11 criteria differ from approaches that emphasize the temperamental nature of cyclothymia. Some researchers have criticized the DSM-5 criteria, arguing that it places excessive emphasis on subthreshold hypomanic and depressive symptoms and fails to adequately capture the broader clinical presentation of cyclothymia, particularly its temperamental features, including mood instability, emotional reactivity, and impulsivity.

Cyclothymia may not be recognized by the affected individual or medical professionals due to its ostensibly mild symptoms. In addition, it is difficult to identify and classify. Due to disagreement and misconceptions among health and mental health professionals, cyclothymia is often diagnosed as "bipolar not otherwise specified". Cyclothymia is also often confused with borderline personality disorder due to their similar symptoms, especially in older adolescents and young adults.

Most people with the disorder present in a depressive state, not realizing that their hypomanic symptom periods are abnormal. Mild hypomanic symptom episodes tend to be interpreted as part of the person's personality or simply a heightened mood. In addition, the disorder often manifests during childhood or adolescence, making it even more difficult for the person to distinguish between symptoms of the disorder and their personality.

== Management ==
Cognitive behavioral therapy (CBT) is considered potentially effective for people diagnosed with cyclothymia.

Medication can be used in addition to behavioral approaches. However, mood stabilizers should be used before antidepressants, and if antidepressants are used they should be used with caution. Antidepressants are a concern due to the possibility of inducing hypomanic switches or rapid cycling.

== Epidemiology ==
Cyclothymia, known today as Cyclothymic Disorder, tends to be underdiagnosed due to its low intensity. The exact rates for cyclothymia have not been widely studied. Some studies estimate that 5–8% are affected at some point in their life whereas other studies suggest a rate ranging 0.4–2.5%.

Men and women appear to be affected equally often, though women are more likely to receive treatment. Cyclothymia has been identified in approximately 20% to 50% of people with mood, anxiety, or other related disorders evaluated in psychiatric outpatient settings, and the proportion may be higher when broader diagnostic approaches are used.

== History ==
In 1883, Karl Ludwig Kahlbaum identified a disorder characterized by recurring mood cycles. The disorder contained both melancholic and manic episodes that occurred in a milder form than in bipolar disorder. This condition was coined "cyclothymia" by Kahlbaum and his student Ewald Hecker. Kahlbaum developed his theory of cyclothymia through his work with people presenting with these symptoms at the Kahlbaum Sanitarium in Goerlitz, Silesia (Germany). He was recognized as a leading hypnotherapist and psychotherapist of his day. He was a progressive in the field of mental health, believing that mental illness should not carry a stigma and that people dealing with mental health issues should be treated humanely. Kalhbaum was the first to recognize that people with cyclothymia often do not seek help for the disorder due to its milder symptoms.

Cyclothymia has been conceptualized in a variety of ways, including as a subtype of bipolar disorder, a temperament, a personality trait, and a personality disorder. There is also an argument that cyclothymia should be considered a neurodevelopmental disorder. The two defining features of the disorder, according to DSM-5, are the presence of depressive and hypomanic symptoms, not meeting the threshold for a depressive or hypomanic episode. Cyclothymia is also classified as a subtype of bipolar disorder in DSM-5, but some researchers disagree with this classification and argue that it should be primarily defined as an exaggeration of mood and emotional instability. In the past, cyclothymia has been conceptualized to include other characteristics in addition to the flux between depression and hypomania, such as mood reactivity, impulsivity, and anxiety.

== Research ==
Whether subtypes of bipolar disorder, such as cyclothymia, truly represent separate disorders or are part of a unique bipolar spectrum is debated in research. Cyclothymia is typically not described in research studies or diagnosed in clinical settings, making it less recognizable and less understood by professionals. This absence of cyclothymia in research and clinical settings suggests that cyclothymia is either being diagnosed as another mood disorder or as a non-affective psychiatric disorder or not coming to scientific or clinical attention due to a lack of diagnostic clarity or because the nature of cyclothymia is still highly contested. Additionally, the current diagnostic criterion for cyclothymia emphasizes that symptoms are persistent, which suggests that they are enduring traits rather than a psychological state, thus, it has been argued that it should be diagnosed as a personality disorder. Since the symptoms tend to overlap with personality disorders, the validity and distinction between these two diagnostic categories has been debated.

Lastly, the tendency of cyclothymia to be comorbid with other mental disorders makes diagnosis difficult. These issues prevent consensus on the definition of cyclothymia and its relationship with other mental disorders among researchers and clinicians. This lack of consensus on an operational definition and symptom presentation is especially pronounced with children and adolescents because the diagnostic criteria have not been adequately adapted to take into account their developmental level.

== Etymology ==
Cyclothymia is derived from the Greek word κυκλοθυμία (from κῦκλος, kyklos, "circle" and θυμός, thymos, "mood, emotion"). Therefore, it means "to cycle or circle between moods or emotions". The term was introduced by German psychiatrist Karl Kahlbaum in his 1882 work On cyclic insanity.

== See also ==
- Bipolar disorder
- Bipolar I disorder
- Bipolar II disorder
- Bipolar NOS
- Outline of bipolar disorder
- Bipolar disorders research
- Borderline personality disorder
- Depression (mood)
- Dysthymia
- Emotional dysregulation
- Euthymia
- List of people with bipolar disorder
- Hypomania
- Mood (psychology)
- Mood swing
- Ultradian bipolar disorder
