= Major depressive episode =

- Specialty: Psychiatry
- Symptoms: Low mood; loss of interest/pleasure; difficulty with concentration; fatigue; excessive guilt; thoughts of death/suicide
- Complications: Self-harm; suicide; difficulty functioning in everyday life
- Duration: Average of 3-12 months, but can last for weeks or years
- Risk factors: Family history; acute stresses (major life changes, adverse life experiences); chronic health problems; genetic predisposition
- Diagnostic method: Based on symptoms as outlined in the DSM-5 and ICD
- Differential diagnosis: Any psychotic disorders; Adjustment disorder; Anxiety disorder; Gender dysphoria; Personality disorder; Substance use disorder
- Treatment: Psychotherapy; antidepressant medication
- Medication: Antidepressants
- Frequency: 13-20% (lifetime risk)

A major depressive episode (MDE) is a period characterized by depressed mood for a duration of at least two weeks and/or loss of interest or pleasure in everyday activities, as well as symptoms such as negative thoughts and emotions, changes in appetite, cognitive difficulties, or suicidal ideation or attempts. Major depressive episodes are the defining characteristic of major depressive disorder (MDD), are part of the diagnostic criteria for bipolar II disorder, and are common (but not required for diagnosis) in bipolar I disorder.

Socioeconomic status, life experience, genetics, and personality traits are believed to be factors in the development of depression and may represent an increased risk of developing a major depressive episode. According to the Nordic Journal of Psychiatry, there is a direct correlation between a major depressive episode and unemployment.

Possible treatments for a major depressive episode include psychotherapy and antidepressants. Electroconvulsive therapy and transcranial magnetic stimulation may be used in cases that do not respond to other treatment. Recovery chance is higher when medication and therapy are combined in moderate-to-severe cases, although in more severe cases, hospitalization or intensive outpatient treatment may be required.

== Signs and symptoms ==
A major depressive episode is defined by either depressed mood or a loss of interest or pleasure in everyday activities, present for at least two weeks. At least four additional depressive symptoms are also required for diagnosis. Depressed mood is the most common symptom, and is often manifested by observable changes in mood or affect (such as tearfulness) or negative emotions (such as feeling sad, anxious, empty, hopeless, indifferent, pessimistic, numb, or irritable). Irritability is a common presentation of depressed mood in children and adolescents in particular. Withdrawal from social settings and neglect of personal relationships often accompany depressed mood, and may be noticed by those close to the person.

Major depressive episodes are known to cause sleep disturbances such as insomnia or, less frequently, hypersomnia. Symptoms of insomnia include trouble falling asleep, trouble staying asleep, or waking up too early in the morning. Hypersomnia may include sleeping for prolonged periods at night or increased sleeping during the daytime. Sleep may not be restful, and the person may feel sluggish despite many hours of sleep, which may be a factor in the worsening of their depressive symptoms, which interfere with other aspects of their lives. This type of sleep disorder may make it harder to fall and stay asleep at night than during the day. Hypersomnia is often associated with atypical depression as well as seasonal affective disorder.

A general lack of energy, fatigue, and tiredness that cannot be otherwise explained is also a symptom of a major depressive episode. A person may feel tired without engaging in any physical activity, which may cause day-to-day tasks, such as showering, to become unmanageable. This may also lead to difficulties with everyday decisions or trouble thinking or concentrating. This criterion requires this difficulty to cause significant difficulty in functioning for those involved in intellectually demanding activities, such as school and work, especially in difficult fields. Individuals with depression often describe a slowing of thought, an inability to concentrate and make decisions, and being easily distracted. In the elderly, the decreased concentration caused by a major depressive episode may present as deficits in memory. This is referred to as pseudodementia and often goes away with treatment. Decreased concentration may be reported by the patient or observed by others.

Changes in motor activity by individuals in a major depressive episode that is slower or faster than normal levels may be noticed by those around them. People with depression may be overly active (psychomotor agitation) or very lethargic (psychomotor retardation). Psychomotor agitation is marked by increased body activity, which may result in restlessness, an inability to sit still, pacing, hand wringing, or fidgeting with clothes or objects. Psychomotor retardation results in a decrease in body activity. In this case, a depressed person may demonstrate a slowing of thinking, speaking, or body movement. They may speak more softly or say less than usual. To meet diagnostic criteria, changes in motor activity must be so abnormal that it can be observed by others. Personal reports of feeling restless or slow do not count towards the diagnostic criteria.

In a major depressive episode, appetite is often decreased without a conscious effort to diet. A person experiencing a depressive episode may have a marked loss or gain of weight (5% of their body weight in one month), which may be the result of a lack of energy. In children, failure to make expected weight gains may be counted towards this criterion. Some individuals also experience increased appetite due to coping through self-soothing and eating. Overeating is often associated with atypical depression.

Individuals experiencing a major depressive episode may have excessive feelings of guilt that go beyond an average level and which are not linked to guilt about being depressed. Major depressive episodes are often accompanied by a significant drop in self-esteem without an obvious reason. The guilt and worthlessness experienced in a major depressive episode can range from subtle guilt to delusions of wrongdoing, shame, and humiliation. Additionally, self-loathing is a common symptom exhibited in patients with clinical depression. Many patients with major depressive disorder exhibit distorted thought patterns and may believe they are not worthy of care from those around them and that their lives have no meaning or purpose. For someone to be diagnosed with a major depressive episode, they must have been feeling this drop of self-esteem and worthlessness for most of the day, multiple days in a row. A short sense of guilt for a minor wrong-doing or the feeling of sadness that goes away after a few hours does not count as a major depressive episode.

A person going through a major depressive episode may have repeated thoughts about death, other than the fear of dying; suicide, with or without a plan; or may have made a suicide attempt. The frequency and intensity of thoughts of suicide can range from believing that friends and family would be better off if one were dead to frequent thoughts about suicide to detailed plans about how the suicide would be carried out. These thoughts may not represent a desire to die, but to stop the emotional pain.

== Causes ==
The cause of a major depressive episode is not well understood. Despite its longstanding prominence in pharmaceutical advertising, the idea that low serotonin levels cause depression is not supported by scientific evidence. One interpretation is that depression manifests due to an imbalance of neurotransmitters in the brain, resulting in feelings of worthlessness and despair. Magnetic resonance imaging shows that the brains of people diagnosed with depression may have a hippocampus up to 10% smaller than those who do not exhibit signs of depression. A family history of depression increases the chance of being diagnosed.

There are usually a combination of biological, psychological, and social factors that play into a person's depression. A major depressive episode can often follow acute stress in someone's life, such as the death of a loved one or being fired from a job. Evidence suggests that psychosocial stressors play a larger role in the first 1–2 depressive episodes while having less influence in later episodes. People who experience a major depressive episode often have other mental health issues. Children with generalized social anxiety disorder may be more likely to experience a major depressive episode.

Other risk factors for a depressive episode include:

- Early childhood trauma
- Family history of a mood disorder
- Lack of interpersonal relationships
- Personality (insecure, worried, stress-sensitive, obsessive, unassertive, dependent)
- Postpartum
- Recent negative life events
- Presence of non-mood-related mental disorders

The cause of depression is believed to be due to a combined effect of genetic and environmental factors. Other medical conditions, for example hypothyroidism, may cause people to experience similar symptoms as a major depressive episode. However, according to the DSM-5, this would be considered a mood disorder due to a general medical condition, not a major depressive episode.

== Diagnosis ==
The criteria below are based on the formal DSM-5 criteria for a major depressive episode. A diagnosis of a major depressive episode requires the patient to have experienced five or more of the symptoms below, one of which must be either a depressive mood or a loss of interest or pleasure (although both are frequently present). These symptoms must be present for at least 2 weeks, represent a change from the patient's normal behavior, and cannot be attributed to another medical condition or substance use. Symptoms must also cause clinically significant distress in important areas of everyday life (e.g. social or occupational).

While they are the defining characteristic of MDD, the DSM-5 also includes the presence of major depressive episodes in the diagnostic criteria for bipolar disorder (specifically bipolar II, though they are commonly present in bipolar I as well). Therefore, the presence of a major depressive episode is not necessarily synonymous with a diagnosis of major depressive disorder; additional factors, such as the presence or absence of manic, hypomanic, or mixed episodes, must also be considered and will affect the ultimate diagnosis.

=== Criteria ===
The two main symptoms of a major depressive episode are a depressed mood and a loss of interest or pleasure. From the list below, one bold symptom and four other symptoms must be presented for at least 2 weeks for a diagnosis of a major depressive episode.

- Weight loss or gain
- Change in body activity (psychomotor changes)
- Change in sleep
- Depressed mood
- Feelings of worthlessness and excessive or inappropriate guilt
- Indecisiveness, confusion, or a decrease in concentration
- Loss of energy
- Loss of interest or pleasure
- Suicidal ideation

=== Differential diagnosis ===
Differential diagnoses include, but are not limited to:

- Adjustment disorder
- Anxiety disorder (Generalized anxiety, PTSD, obsessive-compulsive disorder)
- Depression due to a general medical condition
- Disruptive mood dysregulation disorder
- Dysthymia
- Gender dysphoria
- Personality disorder with depressive symptoms
- Premenstrual dysphoric disorder
- Substance abuse or Substance use disorder

=== Testing ===
No labs are diagnostic of a depressive episode, but some labs can help rule out general medical conditions that may mimic the symptoms of a depressive episode. Healthcare providers may order blood work, including routine blood chemistry, CBC with differential, thyroid function studies, and Vitamin B12 levels, before making a diagnosis.

Healthcare providers may screen patients in the general population for depression using a screening tool, such as the Patient Healthcare Questionnaire-2 (PHQ-2). If the PHQ-2 screening is positive for depression, a provider may then administer the PHQ-9. The Geriatric Depression Scale is a screening tool that can be used in the elderly population.

== Treatment ==
Depression is a treatable illness. Treatments for a major depressive episode may be provided by mental health specialists (e.g. psychologists, psychiatrists, social workers, counselors), mental health centers or organizations, hospitals, outpatient clinics, social service agencies, private clinics, peer support groups, clergy, and employee assistance programs. The treatment plan could include psychotherapy alone, antidepressant medications alone, or a combination of medication and psychotherapy.

For major depressive episodes of severe intensity (multiple symptoms, minimal mood reactivity, and severe functional impairment), combined psychotherapy and antidepressant medications are more effective than psychotherapy alone. Meta-analyses suggest that the combination of psychotherapy and antidepressant medications is more effective in treating mild and moderate forms of depression than either type of treatment alone. Patients with severe symptoms may require outpatient treatment or hospitalization.

The treatment of a major depressive episode can be split into three phases:

1. Acute phase: the goal of this phase is to resolve the current major depressive episode.
2. Continuation: this phase continues the same treatment from the acute phase for 4–8 months after the depressive episode has resolved, and the goal is to prevent relapse.
3. Maintenance: this phase is not necessary for every patient but is often used for patients who have experienced 2–3 (or more) major depressive episodes. Treatment may be maintained indefinitely to prevent the occurrence and severity of future episodes.

=== Therapy ===
Psychotherapy, also known as talk therapy, counseling, or psychosocial therapy, is characterized by a patient discussing their condition and mental health issues with a trained therapist. Therapy alone has been proven to benefit people struggling with various mental illnesses. Different types of psychotherapy are used as a treatment for depression, including cognitive behavioral therapy, interpersonal therapy, dialectical behavior therapy, acceptance and commitment therapy, and mindfulness techniques. Evidence shows that cognitive behavioral therapy can be as effective as medication in treating a major depressive episode.

Psychotherapy may be the first treatment for mild to moderate depression, especially when psychosocial stressors play a large role. Psychotherapy alone may not be as effective for more severe forms of depression, such as depression with a chemical imbalance in the brain.

Some of the main forms of psychotherapy used for the treatment of a major depressive episode, along with what makes them unique, are included below:

- Cognitive psychotherapy: focus on patterns of thinking
- Interpersonal psychotherapy: focus on relationships, losses, and conflict resolution
- Problem-solving psychotherapy: focus on situations and strategies for problem-solving
- Psychodynamic psychotherapy: focus on defense mechanisms and coping strategies

=== Medication ===
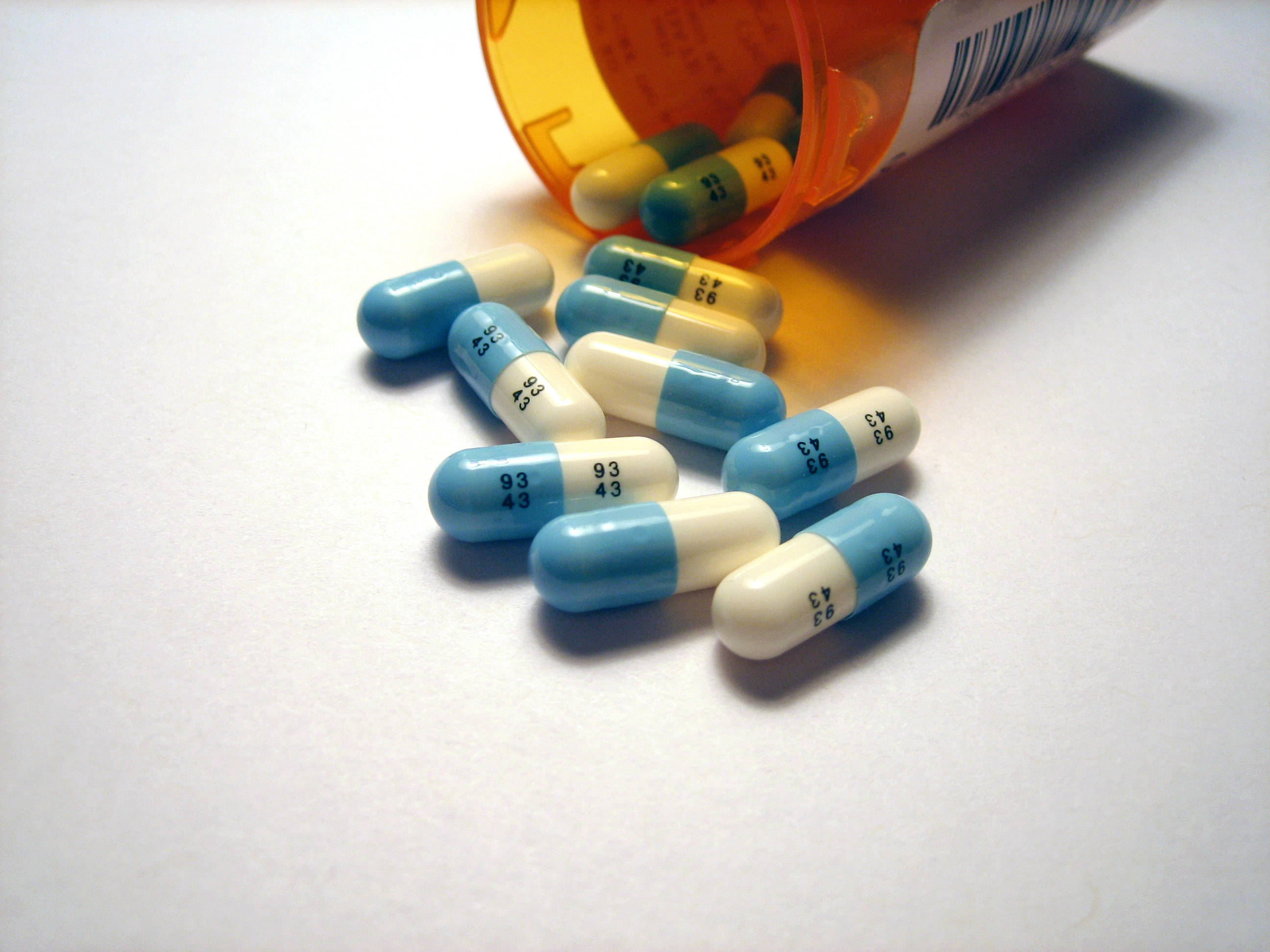
Prozac is one example of an SSRI, the class of antidepressant medications that are used as the first line in the treatment of depression.

Medications used to treat depression include selective serotonin reuptake inhibitors (SSRIs), serotonin-norepinephrine reuptake inhibitors (SNRIs), norepinephrine-dopamine reuptake inhibitors (NDRIs), tricyclic antidepressants, monoamine oxidase inhibitors (MAOIs), and atypical antidepressants such as mirtazapine, which do not fit neatly into any of the other categories. Different antidepressants work better for different individuals; it simply comes down to the person and what they prefer. It is often necessary to try several before finding one that works best for a specific patient. Some people may find it essential to combine medications, which could mean two antidepressants or an antipsychotic medication in addition to an antidepressant. If a person's close relative has responded well to a certain medication, that treatment will likely work well for them. For example, if the depression is familial and the person's mother is prescribed an SSRI, then the same SSRI will most likely benefit the person as well.

For major depressive disorder, antidepressant medications are considered effective in the acute, continuation, and maintenance phases of treatment, as described above. However, use of antidepressants in patients with bipolar disorder is controversial; they can be effective, but certain classes of antidepressants increase the risk of, or cause, episodes of mania.

The treatment benefits of antidepressant medications are often not seen until 1–2 weeks into treatment, with maximum benefits reached around 4–6 weeks. Likely, the person will experience more negative side effects during the first week or two and may want to stop taking the medication. However, they should continue the medication until the 4–6-week mark to know how they feel about it. Most healthcare providers will monitor patients more closely during the acute phase of treatment and continue to monitor them at longer intervals in the continuation and maintenance phases.

Sometimes people stop taking antidepressant medications due to side effects, although these effects often become less severe over time. Suddenly stopping a treatment or missing several doses may cause withdrawal-like symptoms. Some studies have shown that antidepressants may increase short-term suicidal thoughts or actions, especially in children, adolescents, and young adults. However, antidepressants are more likely to reduce a person's risk of suicide in the long run.

Below are listed the main classes of antidepressant medications, some of the most common drugs in each category, and their major side effects:

- Monoamine oxidase inhibitors (isocarboxazid, phenelzine, selegiline): major side effects include dangerously high blood pressure if taken with foods rich in tyramine (e.g. cheeses, some meats, and home-brewed beer), sedation, tremor, and orthostatic hypotension
- Selective serotonin reuptake inhibitors (citalopram, escitalopram, paroxetine, fluoxetine, sertraline): major side effects include nausea, diarrhea, and sexual dysfunction such as erectile dysfunction or anorgasmia
- Serotonin and norepinephrine reuptake inhibitors (duloxetine, venlafaxine, desvenlafaxine): major side effects include nausea, diarrhea, increased heart rate, increased blood pressure, and tremors
- Tricyclic antidepressants (amitryptiline, desipramine, doxepin, imipramine, nortriptyline): major side effects include sedation, low blood pressure when moving from sitting to standing (orthostatic hypotension), tremor, and heart issues like conduction delays or arrhythmias

=== Alternative treatments ===
Various treatment options exist for people who have experienced multiple episodes of major depression or have not responded to several treatments.

Electroconvulsive therapy is a treatment in which a generalized seizure is induced by means of electric current. The mechanism of action of the treatment is not clearly understood, but has been shown to be most effective in the most severely depressed patients. For this reason, electroconvulsive therapy is preferred for the most severe forms of depression or depression that has not responded to other treatments, known as refractory depression.

Vagus nerve stimulation is an alternative treatment that has been proven effective in treating depression, especially for people who have been resistant to four or more treatments. Some of the unique benefits of vagus nerve stimulation include improved neurocognitive function and sustained clinical response.

Transcranial magnetic stimulation is another alternative treatment for a major depressive episode. It is a non-invasive treatment that is easily tolerated and shows an antidepressant effect, especially in people with more typical depression and younger adults.

== Prognosis ==
If left untreated, a typical major depressive episode may last for several months. About 20% of these episodes can last two years or more, while about half end spontaneously. However, even after the major depressive episode is over 20% to 30% of patients have residual symptoms, which can be distressing and associated with disability. Fifty percent of people will have another major depressive episode after the first. However, the risk of relapse is decreased by taking antidepressant medications for more than 6 months.

Symptoms completely improve in six to eight weeks in 60% to 70% of patients. The combination of therapy and antidepressant medications has been shown to improve the resolution of symptoms and the outcomes of treatment.

Suicide is the 8th leading cause of death in the United States. The risk of suicide increases during a major depressive episode. However, the risk is even higher during the acute and continuation phases of treatment. There are several factors associated with an increased risk of suicide, listed below:

- Alcohol or drug use or comorbid psychiatric disorder
- Detailed plan
- Family history of suicide or mental illness
- Greater than 45 years of age
- History of suicide attempts or self-injurious behaviors
- Inability to accept help
- Lack of social support
- Male
- Poor health
- Psychotic features (auditory or visual hallucinations, disorganization of speech, behavior, or thought)
- Recent severe loss
- Severe depression

== Epidemiology ==
Estimates of the number of people with major depressive episodes and major depressive disorder (MDD) vary significantly. Overall, 13–20% of people will experience significant depressive symptoms at some point. The overall prevalence of MDD is slightly lower, ranging from 3.7% to 6.7% of people. In their lifetime, 20% to 25% of women and 7% to 12% of men will have a major depressive episode. The peak period of development is between the ages of 25 and 44. The onset of major depressive episodes or MDD often occurs in people in their mid-20s and less often in those over 65. The prevalence of depressive symptoms in the elderly is around 1–2%. Elderly persons in nursing homes may have increased rates, up to 15–25%. African-Americans have higher rates of depressive symptoms compared to other races. Prepubescent girls are affected at a slightly higher rate than prepubescent boys.

In a National Institute of Mental Health study, researchers found that more than 40% of people with post-traumatic stress disorder had depression four months after they experienced the traumatic event.

Women who have recently given birth may be at increased risk of having a major depressive episode. This is referred to as postpartum depression and is a different health condition than the baby blues, a low mood that resolves within 10 days after delivery.

== See also ==
- Bipolar disorder
- Depression (differential diagnoses)
- Depressive personality disorder
- Major depressive disorder
- Mental breakdown

== Sources ==
- Costandi, Moheb (24 July 2015) Two genetic variants linked to depression doi:10.1038/nmiddleeast.2015.122 nature middle east Springer Nature Limited Retrieved 23 January 2021
- Drs; Sartorius, Norman; Henderson, A.S.; Strotzka, H.; Lipowski, Z.; Yu-cun, Shen; You-xin, Xu; Strömgren, E.; Glatzel, J.; Kühne, G.-E.; Misès, R.; Soldatos, C.R.; Pull, C.B.; Giel, R.; Jegede, R.; Malt, U.; Nadzharov, R.A.; Smulevitch, A.B.; Hagberg, B.; Perris, C.; Scharfetter, C.; Clare, A.; Cooper, J.E.; Corbett, J.A.; Griffith Edwards, J.; Gelder, M.; Goldberg, D.; Gossop, M.; Graham, P.; Kendell, R.E.; Marks, I.; Russell, G.; Rutter, M.; Shepherd, M.; West, D.J.; Wing, J.; Wing, L.; Neki, J.S.; Benson, F.; Cantwell, D.; Guze, S.; Helzer, J.; Holzman, P.; Kleinman, A.; Kupfer, D.J.; Mezzich, J.; Spitzer, R.; Lokar, J. "The ICD-10 Classification of Mental and Behavioural Disorders Clinical descriptions and diagnostic guidelines" (PDF). www.who.int World Health Organization. Microsoft Word. bluebook.doc – via Microsoft Bing.
- Dunn, Eric C.; Wang, Min-Jung; Perlis, Roy H. (2019) Chapter 1. A Summary of Recent Updates on the Genetic Determinants of Depression p. 3 left column Major Depressive Disorder by Roger S McIntyre, Carola Rong, Mehala Subramaniapillai Elsevier ISBN 9780323581325 Retrieved 23 January 2021
