= Euthymia (medicine) =

Tranquil mental state or mood

In psychiatry and psychology, euthymia is a normal, tranquil mental state or mood. People with mood disorders, including major depressive disorder and bipolar disorder, experience euthymia as a stable mood state that is neither depressive nor manic. Achieving and maintaining euthymia is the goal of treatment for bipolar patients in particular.

== Etymology ==
The term euthymia is derived from the Greek words ευ eu 'well' and θυμός thymos 'spirit'. The word “thymos” had four meanings: life energy, feelings/passions, desire/will, and thought/intelligence; and was also tied to the social dimension e.g. seeking honor from others. The verb form "euthymeo” meant both “I am happy, in good spirits” and “I make others happy, I reassure and encourage”.

Democritus, who coined the philosophical concept of euthymia, said that euthymia is achieved when "one is satisfied with what is present and available, taking little heed of people who are envied and admired and observing the lives of those who suffer and yet endure". This was later amended in the translation given by the Roman philosopher Seneca the Younger in which euthymia means a state of internal calm and contentment. Seneca was also the first to link the state of euthymia to a learning process; in order to achieve it, one must be aware of psychological well-being. Seneca’s definition included a caveat about detachment from current events. Later, the Greek biographer Plutarch removed this caveat with his definition which focused more on learning from adverse events.

== History ==
In 1958, Marie Jahoda gave a modern clinical definition of mental health in the terms of positive symptoms by outlining the criteria for mental health: "autonomy (regulation of behavior from within), environmental mastery, satisfactory interactions with other people and the milieu, the individual’s style and degree of growth, development or self-actualization, the attitudes of an individual toward his/her own self". In her definition she acknowledged the absence of disease as being necessary, but not enough, to constitute positive mental health, or euthymia.

=== Expansion of clinical concept ===
The traditional clinical concept of euthymia is an absence of disorder. This turns out to be insufficient: patients considered to be in remission, i.e. not displaying symptoms meeting the threshold for diagnosis, still show impairments in psychological well-being compared to healthy subjects.

Carol Ryff (1989) was the first to develop a comprehensive scale that could assess euthymia: the six-factor model of psychological well-being. The 84-item scale includes facets of self-acceptance, positive relations with others, autonomy, environmental mastery, purpose in life, and personal growth. Garamoni et al (1991) described euthymia as having a balance between the positive and negative in six dimensions of cognition and affects similar to the Ryff factors. Having too much positivity in one factor is not euthymia: for example, a person with too little "purpose in life" would lack a sense of meaning in life, while one with too much would have unrealistic expectations and hopes.

The concept of resilience (or, resistance to stress) was added again in the 2000s by authors in the field. Fava and Bech (2016)'s definition can be seen as a modern example:

- Lack of mood disturbances. As with the older clinical sense, full remission from past mood disorder. If there is any sadness, anxiety, or irritable mood, it should be short-lived and possible to be interrupted.
- Positive affects. Cheerfulness, relaxation, interest in things, plus restorative sleep.
- Psychological well-being. Flexibility (balance of psychic forces, similar to Garamoni), consistency (a unifying outlook on life), resillance (resistance to stress), and tolerance to anxiety and frustration.

=== Medical applications of the expanded concept ===
In 1987, Kellner R published the Symptom Questionnaire, containing 24 items referring to positive feelings and 68 referring to the negative. With the inclusion of positive feelings such as relaxation and friendliness, the SQ was found to be more sensitive to the effects of psychotrophic medication. A number of other scales, such as the WHO-5, PWB, AAQ-II, CIE, have been developed to also measure the positive side of euthymia.

Macro-analysis and micro-analysis are techniques used by clinicians to combine the assessments of psychological well-being and distress. Using both fields may offer more insight into the planning of treatment: for example, well-being therapy (WBT) can be used to help a patient self-observe and increase periods of well-being, while cognitive behavioral therapy (CBT) can be used to target distress. Other therapies that focus on aspects of well-being include mindfulness-based cognitive therapy (MBCT), acceptance and commitment therapy (ACT) which focus on flexibility, and the less-proven Pedasky and Mooney's strengths-based CBT and forgiveness therapy.

A few clinical trials have been done using a sequential model, where patients who have responded to antidepressants are tapered off the drug and then given a combination cognitive-wellbeing therapy. Although the results have been impressive with regard to relapse rates, it is unclear how much is due to this added well-being component. In a different trial setup, anxiety patients who have responded to behavioral theapy and mood disorder patients who have responded to medication are assigned to either CBT or WBT for residual symptoms. While both achieved a significant reduction of symptoms, WBT provided more benefit in terms of observer rating and PWB scores. WBT may also be applicable to cyclothymic disorder. MBCT seem to be an effective add-on to treatment-as-usual in treatment-resistant depression.

== See also ==
- Cyclothymia
- Hyperthymia
- Dysphoria
- Euphoria
- Hypomania
- Quality of life
