= Bipolar I disorder =

Bipolar disorder that is characterized by at least one manic or mixed episode

- Other names: Manic-depressive disorder, bipolar affective disorder
- Specialty: Psychiatry
- Symptoms: Periods of depression and elevated mood
- Complications: Suicide, self-harm
- Usual onset: 15–25 years of age
- Causes: Complex
- Risk factors: Family history
- Diagnostic method: By psychiatric evaluation
- Differential diagnosis: Other bipolar disorders, borderline personality disorder, antisocial personality disorder
- Treatment: Counseling, medication
- Medication: Lithium, antipsychotics, anticonvulsants
- Frequency: ~1% of the global population is affected
- Deaths: 15–20% die by suicide

Bipolar I disorder (also referred to as BD-I or type one bipolar disorder) is a type of bipolar spectrum disorder characterized by the occurrence of at least one manic episode. Symptoms of bipolar I disorder typically begin at 15–25 years of age, with depression being the most common initial symptom. People may also have one or more depressive episodes. Typically, manic episodes can last at least 7 days for most of each day to the extent that the individual may need medical attention, while the depressive episodes last at least 2 weeks. The prevalence of bipolar disorders is about 1% worldwide. Bipolar I disorder is associated with higher rates of comorbid medical illness. Treatment varies based on presentation with several medication options and combinations.

== Signs and symptoms ==
Bipolar I disorder is characterized by severe, recurrent mood changes and behavioral changes. A manic episode is a key feature of bipolar I disorder and is required for diagnosis of bipolar I disorder. Hypomanic episodes, major depressive episodes, and psychotic features may also be present but are not necessary for diagnosis. In contrast, Bipolar II disorder is more often characterized by depressive and hypomanic episodes. Cyclothymia is characterized by depressive and hypomanic symptoms that do not meet criteria for Bipolar disorder or Major Depressive disorder.

Graph illustrating mood fluctuations in bipolar disorders

=== Manic episodes ===
A manic episode is a distinct period of time, usually lasting at least one week and for most of each day, where an individual experiences persistent irritable mood or persistent euphoria or elation that is disproportionately out of norm. These symptoms are severe, and cause either significant impairment in an individual's life or require hospitalization. Furthermore, these symptoms and changes are not caused by medications, illicit substances, or another medical condition.

=== Hypomanic episodes ===
Similar to mania, hypomanic episodes involve distinct periods of time where an individual experiences persistent, increased energy, euphoria, elation, or irritable mood that is disproportionately out of norm. They differ in severity of impairment and symptom duration. A hypomanic episode lasts a minimum of 4 days in a row and for most of the day and does not require hospitalization or involve psychotic symptoms.

=== Depressive episodes ===
A depressive episode involves depressed mood or anhedonia (lack of interest or pleasure) in addition to other symptoms of depression that lasts for at least 2 weeks. Other symptoms of depression include unintentional weight changes, changes in appetite, sleep disruption (lack of sleep or excessive sleep), restlessness or slowness, lack of energy, difficulty concentrating, and suicidal ideation.

=== Psychosis ===
Most people with bipolar disorder experience psychosis during their lifetime, with one half to two-thirds of people experiencing it. Symptoms of psychosis include delusions, hallucinations, or both. Delusions are more common than hallucinations in bipolar disorder. Psychotic symptoms occur more frequently during manic or mixed episodes. Having psychotic episodes indicates a more severe illness. People with psychosis have poor insight and more agitation, anxiety, and hostility. Psychotic symptoms are more common in bipolar type I compared to bipolar type II.

== Risk factors ==
Currently, there are no single, clear causes of bipolar disorder. However, there are evidence that suggest there may be a genetic component that contribute to the development of bipolar disorder. Studies from identical twins suggest that there is a 5-10% lifetime risk (about seven times greater compared to the general population) of developing bipolar disorder if there is a first-degree relative diagnosed with bipolar disorder. Bipolar disorder appears to be more common in high-income countries compared to low-income countries, and higher rates of bipolar I disorder are seen in individuals that are separated, divorced, or widowed compared to those who are married or never married. Protective factors include absence of substance use, absence of child abuse, and social network.

== Diagnosis ==
The essential feature of bipolar I disorder is a clinical course characterized by the occurrence of one or more manic episodes or mixed episodes. One episode of mania is sufficient to make the diagnosis of bipolar disorder. Often, individuals have had one or more major depressive episodes and may or may not have a history of major depressive disorder. Because depression is typically one of the first symptoms of bipolar disorders, the initial diagnosis of bipolar disorder may be delayed. Additionally, due to the chronic presentation, it is possible it may take several years to diagnose. Collateral information collected improves diagnostic accuracy. Features of manic episodes, mixed episodes, and depressive episodes may be collected by eliciting memory of previous symptoms as one may not have identified it as a named episode in the past.

Episodes of substance-induced mood disorder due to the direct effects of a medication, or other somatic treatments for depression, substance use disorder, or toxin exposure, or of mood disorder due to a general medical condition need to be excluded before a diagnosis of bipolar I disorder can be made. Bipolar I disorder requires confirmation of only 1 full manic episode for diagnosis, but may be associated with hypomanic and depressive episodes as well. In contrast, diagnosis for bipolar II disorder does not include a full manic episode; instead, it requires the occurrence of both a hypomanic episode and a major depressive episode. Serious aggression has been reported to occur in one out of every ten major, first-episode, BD-I patients with psychotic features, the prevalence in this group being particularly high in association with a recent suicide attempt, alcohol use disorder, learning disability, or manic polarity in the first episode.

Bipolar I disorder often coexists with other disorders including PTSD, substance use disorders, and a variety of mood disorders. Studies suggest that psychiatric comorbidities correlate with further impairment of day-to-day life. Up to 40% of people with bipolar disorder also present with PTSD, with higher rates occurring in women and individuals with bipolar I disorder. A diagnosis of bipolar 1 disorder is only given if bipolar episodes are not better accounted for by schizoaffective disorder or superimposed on schizophrenia, schizophreniform disorder, delusional disorder, or a psychotic disorder not otherwise specified.

=== Medical assessment ===
Regular medical assessments are performed to rule-out secondary causes of mania and depression. These tests include complete blood count, glucose, serum chemistry/electrolyte panel, thyroid function test, liver function test, renal function test, urinalysis, vitamin B_{12} and folate levels, HIV screening, syphilis screening, and pregnancy test, and when clinically indicated, an electrocardiogram (ECG), an electroencephalogram (EEG), a computed tomography (CT scan), or a magnetic resonance imagining (MRI) may be ordered. Drug screening includes recreational drugs, particularly synthetic cannabinoids, and exposure to toxins. Specifically, drugs such as methamphetamines can induce a manic presentation.

=== Diagnostic and Statistical Manual of Mental Disorders, 4th Edition (DSM-IV-TR) ===
Dx code #	Disorder	Description
296.0x	Bipolar I disorder	Single manic episode
296.40	Bipolar I disorder	Most recent episode hypomanic
296.4x	Bipolar I disorder	Most recent episode manic
296.5x	Bipolar I disorder	Most recent episode depressed
296.6x	Bipolar I disorder	Most recent episode mixed
296.7	Bipolar I disorder	Most recent episode unspecified

=== Diagnostic and Statistical Manual of Mental Disorders, 5th Edition (DSM-5) ===
In May 2013, American Psychiatric Association released the fifth edition of the Diagnostic and Statistical Manual of Mental Disorders (DSM-5). There are several proposed revisions to occur in the diagnostic criteria of Bipolar I Disorder and its subtypes. For Bipolar I Disorder 296.40 (most recent episode hypomanic) and 296.4x (most recent episode manic), the proposed revision includes the following specifiers: with psychotic features, with mixed features, with catatonic features, with rapid cycling, with anxiety (mild to severe), with suicide risk severity, with seasonal pattern, and with postpartum onset. Bipolar I Disorder 296.5x (most recent episode depressed) will include all of the above specifiers plus the following: with melancholic features and with atypical features. The categories for specifiers will be removed in DSM-5 and criterion A will add or there are at least 3 symptoms of major depression of which one of the symptoms is depressed mood or anhedonia. For Bipolar I Disorder 296.7 (most recent episode unspecified), the listed specifiers will be removed.

=== ICD-10 ===
- F31 Bipolar Affective Disorder
- F31.6 Bipolar Affective Disorder, Current Episode Mixed
- F30 Manic Episode
- F30.0 Hypomania
- F30.1 Mania Without Psychotic Symptoms
- F30.2 Mania With Psychotic Symptoms
- F32 Depressive Episode
- F32.0 Mild Depressive Episode
- F32.1 Moderate Depressive Episode
- F32.2 Severe Depressive Episode Without Psychotic Symptoms
- F32.3 Severe Depressive Episode With Psychotic Symptoms

=== Differential diagnosis ===
When evaluating an individual for bipolar I disorder, other psychiatric conditions that mimic or present with similar symptoms to bipolar I disorder must be considered. It is possible that some of these may be co-occurring with bipolar I disorder.

- Other bipolar disorders, such as bipolar II or bipolar disorder due to another medical condition. Examples include endocrine causes such as hyperthyroidism, hypothyroidism, Addison's disease, and Cushing syndrome. Additional examples include infectious etiology such as HIV and neurosyphilis.
- Major depressive disorder with hypomanic or manic symptoms
- Anxiety disorders including generalized anxiety disorder (GAD), panic disorder, post-traumatic stress disorder (PTSD)
- Attention deficit hyperactivity disorder (ADHD)
- Substance or medication-induced bipolar disorder
- Personality disorders such as borderline personality disorder

== Management ==
=== Medication ===
Pharmacotherapy is the primary method of managing bipolar disorder, with multiple medications and combinations available.

General Information

1. Lithium (has a narrow therapeutic range and typically requires monitoring). It has suicide-protective effects, with an 87% reduction in suicide risk compared to placebos in mood disorders.
2. Anticonvulsants, such as valproate, carbamazepine, or lamotrigine
3. Atypical antipsychotics, such as quetiapine, risperidone, olanzapine, lurasidone, or aripiprazole
4. Combination therapies such as lithium or valproate with antipsychotics

Medications used may vary depending on the side effect profile and patient preference as well as the phase of bipolar disorder being managed (acute mania, bipolar depression, mixed states, or maintenance relapse prevention).

Medications used based on presentation of phase of Bipolar I disorder
Phase of Bipolar I disorder	Current Guidelines
Acute Mania	Current CANMAT/ISBD guidelines recommend a mood stabilizer such as Lithium or Valproate. Alternatively, can use a second-generation antipsychotic such as Quetiapine, Risperidone, or Aripriprazole.
Acute Bipolar Depression	First-line treatment guidelines recommend Quetiapine, Lurasidone, Lithium, or Lamotrigine. Additionally, combination treatment strategy can be considered with Lithium plus Lamotrigine, or Lurasidone plus Lithium.
Maintenance Relapse Prevention	Lithium remains first-line treatment recommended by international guidelines. Alternative treatments include Quetiapine, Lamotrigine, Aripriprazole, or Olanzapine.

CANMAT/ISBD guidelines were published in 2022.A review of validated treatment guidelines for bipolar disorder by international bodies was published in 2020.

When starting medications for bipolar I disorder, it is crucial to monitor certain lab values and assess for side effects. Specific side effects depend on the medications used. In general, some examples of certain side effects to monitor for are acute liver injury, hyponatremia, lithium levels, body mass index, weight, and QT interval.

Usage of antidepressants alone in the treatment of bipolar disorders is not recommended. However, antidepressants may be used to supplement mood stabilizers or second-generation antipsychotics (adjuvant therapy). There has been concerns that usage of antidepressants may cause individuals to switch to mania (sometimes referred to as antidepressant-induced mania). Current studies have not shown clear differences in significant risk of switching to mania between different antidepressants when compared to placebos.

For the treatment of treatment-resistant bipolar depression, the NMDA receptor antagonist ketamine and its S-enantiomer esketamine (Spravato) have emerged as rapid-acting anesthetic/sedative options with less risk of overdose than other anesthetics. They act quickly to block NMDA receptors and treat depression, with effects lasting up to a week.

Patients with bipolar disorder may struggle with non-adherence to pharmacological treatment; long-acting injectable antipsychotics may be beneficial with adherence to some patients.

=== Other Interventions ===
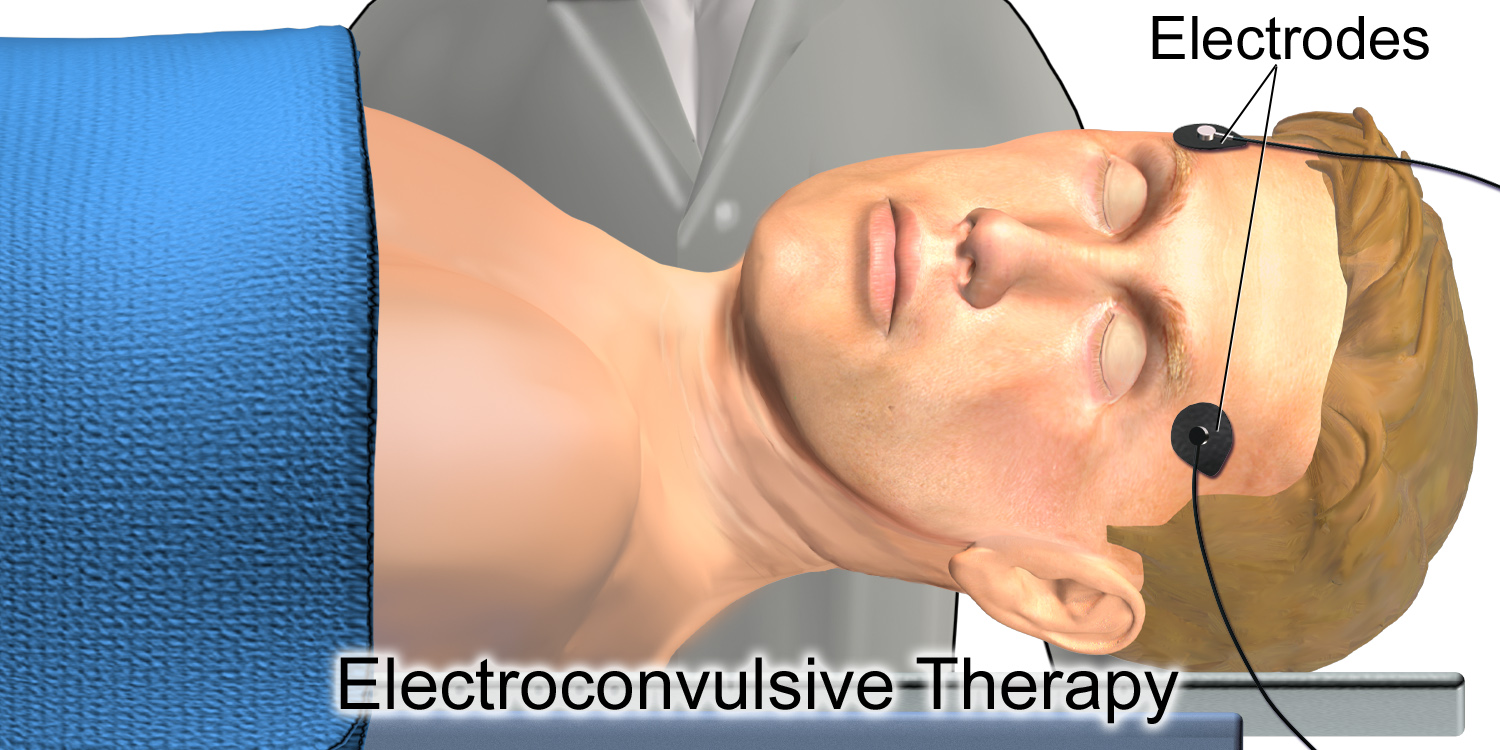
Graphic demonstrating ECT

In severe cases, electroconvulsive therapy (ECT), a type of brain stimulation therapy where seizures are electrically induced in anesthetized patients for therapeutic effect, may be used for bipolar depression. The use of transcranial magnetic stimulation (TMS) for treatment-resistant bipolar I disorder has been hypothesized. However, the current data on the safety and efficacy is limited.

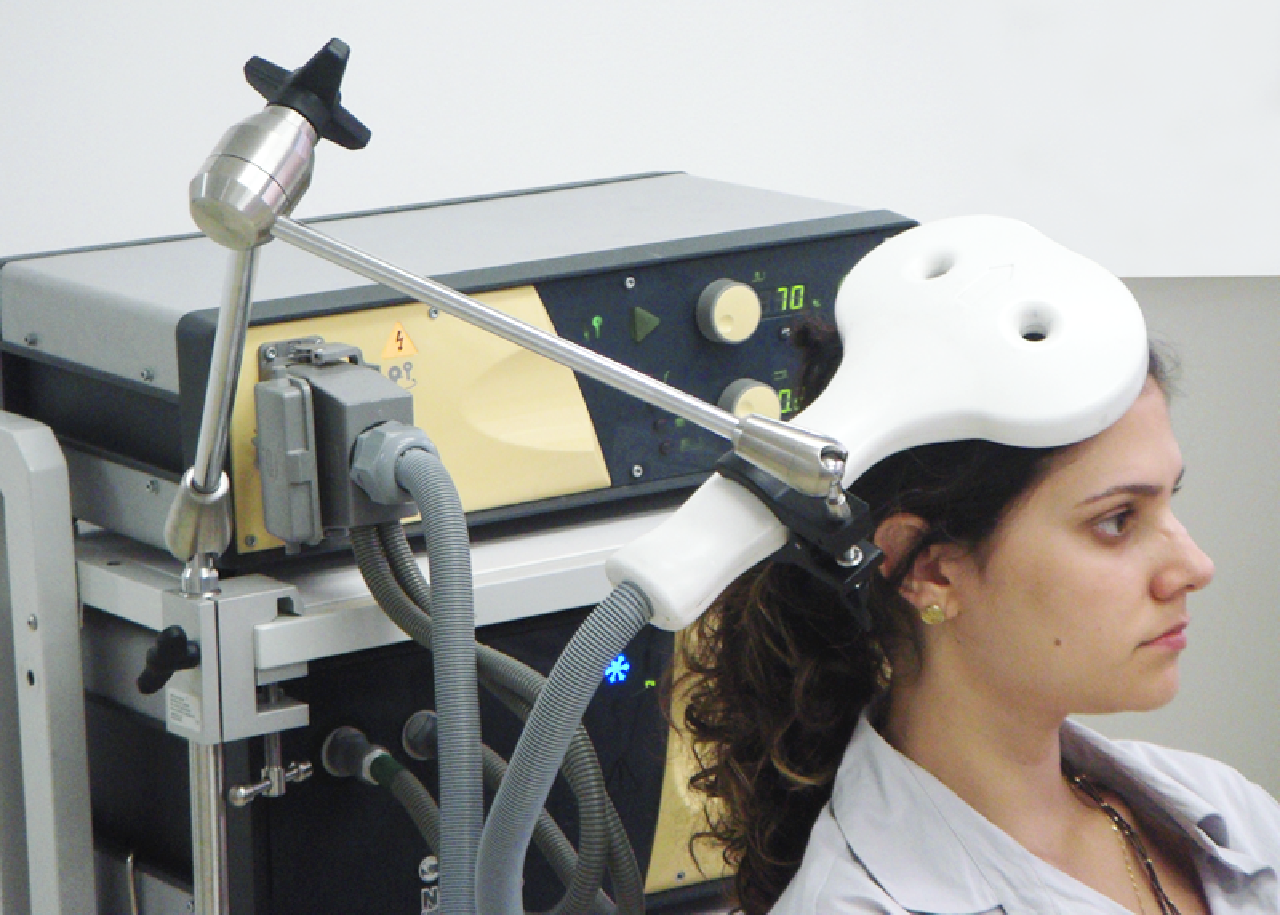
Graphic demonstrating TMS

Patients with bipolar disorder may benefit from supplemental psychotherapy (e.g., cognitive behavioral therapy) in reducing recurrences and stabilizing depressive phases. Additionally, if there is a concurrent Borderline Personality Disorder, dialectical behavior therapy could be beneficial. Interventions that target sleep regulation and mood monitoring, as well as efforts to reduce stigma, are beneficial in improving their quality of life.

== Prognosis ==
Bipolar I is a chronic, recurrent psychiatric illness. Patients with Bipolar I tend to have a better prognosis if there is early diagnosis, social support, and strong adherence to current medication and therapy guidelines. Alternatively, it can have a poor prognosis, if associated with substance abuse, psychotic features, depressive symptoms, and inter-episode depression. A manic episode can be so severe that it requires hospitalization. An estimated 63% of all BP-I related mania results in hospitalization. The natural course of BP-I, if left untreated, leads to episodes becoming more frequent or severe over time. The absolute risk of suicide is highest for BP-I than all other mood and mental disorders. Approximately 15–20% of people with bipolar disorder die by suicide, with 30–60% making at least one attempt. The attempts use more lethal means than those among the general population. Individuals with BP-I typically have a shorter life expectancy compared to the general population, with estimates suggesting a reduction of 11 to 20 years. With proper treatment, individuals with BP-I can, however, lead a healthy lifestyle.

=== Education ===
Psychosocial interventions can be used for managing acute depressive episodes and for maintenance treatment to aid in relapse prevention. This includes psychoeducation, cognitive behavioral therapy (CBT), family-focused therapy (FFT), interpersonal and social rhythm therapy (IPSRT), and peer support.

Information on the condition, importance of regular sleep patterns, routines and eating habits and the importance of compliance with medication as prescribed. Behavior modification through counseling can have positive influence to help reduce the effects of risky behavior during the manic phase. Additionally, the lifetime prevalence for bipolar I disorder is estimated to be 1%, while bipolar spectrum disorder has been estimated to affect as much as 6% of people.

Additionally, patients can benefit from participating in peer-led support groups. Patients with Bipolar I disorder can also be educated regarding the possibility of comorbid suicidal ideation. Patients can complete a safety plan to recognize warning signs, be provided with crisis line resources, and access to help.

== See also ==
- Outline of bipolar disorder
- Bipolar disorder not otherwise specified
- Cyclothymia
- Bipolar disorders research
- History of bipolar disorder
- Creativity and bipolar disorder
- List of people with bipolar disorder
- International Society for Bipolar Disorders
- Listing of DSM-IV-TR bipolar disorder diagnostics codes
- Kleine–Levin syndrome
- Seasonal affective disorder
- Racing thoughts
- Emotional dysregulation
