= Hypomania =

Mental health condition

- Specialty: Psychiatry
- Symptoms: Euphoria; inflated self-esteem; irritability; decreased need for sleep; flight of ideas; pressured speech; hyperactivity; impulsivity; disinhibition; distractibility
- Complications: Progression to mania; poor judgment; hypersexuality; subsequent depression
- Causes: Bipolar disorder; certain medications; multiple sclerosis
- Differential diagnosis: Mania; hyperthymia; attention deficit hyperactive disorder; autism spectrum disorder; hyperthyroidism; narcissistic personality disorder; substance intoxication
- Medication: Mood stabilizers; antipsychotics

Simplified graphical comparison of bipolar I, bipolar II and cyclothymia

Hypomania (literally "below mania" or "less than mania") is a psychiatric condition of abnormally heightened mood and increased energy that is less severe than mania. It is characterized essentially by an apparently non-contextual elevation of mood (i.e., euphoria) compared to the person's baseline mood. It is often accompanied by increased energy, irritability, impulsivity, or disinhibited behavior. The individual with the condition may experience irritability, not necessarily less severe than full mania.

According to DSM-5 criteria, hypomania is distinct from mania in that there is no significant functional impairment. Mania, by DSM-5 definition, does include significant functional impairment and may have psychotic features.

Other characteristic behaviors of individuals experiencing hypomania are a very notable decrease in the need for sleep, an overall increase in energy, unusual behaviors and actions, and a markedly distinctive increase in talkativeness and confidence, commonly exhibited with a flight of creative ideas. Other symptoms may include feelings of grandiosity, distractibility, and hypersexuality.

While hypomanic behavior often generates productivity and excitement, it can become troublesome if the subject engages in risky or otherwise inadvisable behaviors, and/or if the symptoms manifest themselves in ways that interfere with everyday life. When manic episodes are separated into stages of a progression according to symptomatic severity and associated features, hypomania constitutes the first stage of the syndrome, wherein the cardinal features (euphoria or heightened irritability, pressure of speech, hyperactivity, increased energy, decreased need for sleep, and flight of ideas) are most plainly evident.

== Signs and symptoms ==
Individuals in a hypomanic state may have a decreased need for sleep, may be extremely gregarious and competitive, and have a great deal of energy. They are, otherwise, often fully functioning (unlike individuals experiencing a manic episode).

=== Distinctive markers ===
Specifically, hypomania is distinguished from mania by the absence of psychotic symptoms, and by its lesser degree of impact on functioning.

Hypomania is a feature of bipolar II disorder and cyclothymia, but can also occur in schizoaffective disorder. Hypomania is also a feature of bipolar I disorder; it arises in sequential procession as the mood disorder fluctuates between normal mood (i.e., euthymia) and mania. Some individuals with bipolar I disorder have hypomanic as well as manic episodes. Hypomania can also occur when moods progress downwards from a manic mood state to a normal mood. Hypomania is sometimes credited with increasing creativity and productive energy. Numerous people with bipolar disorder have credited hypomania with giving them an edge in their theater of work.

People who experience hyperthymia, or "chronic hypomania", encounter the similar symptoms as hypomania but on a longer-term basis.

=== Associated disorders ===
Cyclothymia, a condition of continuous mood fluctuations, is characterized by oscillating experiences sub-threshold symptoms of hypomania and depression that fail to meet the diagnostic criteria for either manic or major depressive episodes. These periods are often interspersed with periods of relatively normal (euthymic) functioning.

When a patient presents with a history of at least one episode of both hypomania and major depression, each of which meet the diagnostic criteria, bipolar II disorder is diagnosed. In some cases, depressive episodes routinely occur during the fall or winter and hypomanic ones in the spring or summer. In such cases, one speaks of a "seasonal pattern".

If left untreated, and in those so predisposed, hypomania may transition into mania, which may be psychotic, in which case bipolar I disorder is the correct diagnosis.

== Causes ==
Often in those who have experienced their first episode of hypomania—by definition without psychotic features—there may be a long or recent history of depression or a mix of hypomania combined with depression (known as a mixed affective state) prior to the emergence of manic symptoms. This commonly surfaces in the mid to late teens. Because the teenage years are typically an emotionally charged time of life, it is not unusual for mood swings to be passed off as normal hormonal teen behavior and for a diagnosis of bipolar disorder to be missed until there is evidence of an obvious manic or hypomanic phase.

In cases of drug-induced hypomanic episodes in people with unipolar depression, the hypomania can almost invariably be eliminated by lowering medication dosage, discontinuing the drug entirely, or changing to a different medication if discontinuation of treatment is not possible.

Hypomania can be associated with narcissistic personality disorder.

== Psychopathology ==
Mania and hypomania are usually studied together as components of bipolar disorders, and the pathophysiology is usually assumed to be the same. Given that noradrenergic and dopaminergic drugs are capable of triggering hypomania, theories relating to monoamine hyperactivity have been proposed. A theory unifying depression and mania in bipolar individuals proposes that decreased serotonergic regulation of other monoamines can result in either depressive or manic symptoms. Lesions on the right side frontal and temporal lobes have further been associated with mania.

== Diagnosis ==
The DSM-IV-TR defines a hypomanic episode as including, over the course of at least four days, elevated mood plus three of the following symptoms OR irritable mood plus four of the following symptoms, when the behaviors are clearly different from how the person typically acts when not depressed:

- pressured speech
- inflated self-esteem or grandiosity
- decreased need for sleep
- flight of ideas or the subjective experience that thoughts are racing
- easily distracted
- increase in goal-directed activity (e.g., social activity, at work, or hypersexuality), or psychomotor agitation
- involvement in pleasurable activities that may have a high potential for negative psycho-social or physical consequences (e.g., sexual indiscretions, reckless driving, physical and verbal conflicts, inappropriate professional and/or financial behavior, etc.).

== Treatment ==
=== Medications ===
Antimanic drugs are used to control acute attacks and prevent recurring episodes of hypomania combined with a range of psychological therapies The recommended length of treatment ranges from two to five years. Antidepressants may also be required for existing treatments but are avoided in patients who have had a recent history with hypomania. Sertraline has often been debated to have side effects that can trigger hypomania.

These include antipsychotics such as:

- Aripiprazole
- Clozapine
- Haloperidol
- Levomepromazine (not available in the United States)
- Olanzapine
- Paliperidone
- Quetiapine
- Risperidone
- Ziprasidone

Other antimanic drugs that are not antipsychotics include:

- Carbamazepine
- Lithium
- Oxcarbazepine
- Valproate

Benzodiazepines such as clonazepam or lorazepam may be used to control agitation and excitement in the short-term.

Other drugs used to treat symptoms of mania/hypomania but considered less effective include:

- Gabapentin
- Lamotrigine
- Levetiracetam
- Topiramate

== Etymology ==
The Ancient Greek physicians Hippocrates and Aretaeus called one personality type "manic" (Greek: μαινόμενοι, mainómenoi). In 19th-century psychiatry, when mania had a broad meaning of insanity, hypomania was equated by some to concepts of "partial insanity" or monomania. German neuro-psychiatrist Emanuel Ernst Mendel introduced hypomania ("hypo" meaning "under" in Greek) as a specific type of mania in 1881, writing, "Under these circumstances, with regard to the 'μαινόμενοι' already used by Hippocrates, I propose that the forms of mania which show the typical clinical picture of mania only in a slight development, in a way abortive, should be called hypomania.". Narrower operational definitions of hypomania were developed in the 1960s and 1970s.

== See also ==
- Antibiomania
- Bipolar II disorder
- Borderline personality disorder
- Creativity and mental illness
- Depression (mood)
- Dysthymia
- Bertram D. Lewin
- List of people with bipolar disorder
- Mania
- Wilson's disease
