= Mood Disorder Questionnaire =

Self-report questionnaire for bipolar disorder

- LOINC: 85102-2

The Mood Disorder Questionnaire (MDQ) is a self-report questionnaire designed to help detect bipolar disorder. It focuses on symptoms of hypomania and mania, which are the mood states that separate bipolar disorders from other types of depression and mood disorder. It has 5 main questions, and the first question has 13 parts, for a total of 17 questions. The MDQ was originally tested with adults, but it also has been studied in adolescents ages 11 years and above. It takes approximately 5–10 minutes to complete. In 2006, a parent-report version was created to allow for assessment of bipolar symptoms in children or adolescents from a caregiver perspective, with the research looking at youths as young as 5 years old. The MDQ has become one of the most widely studied and used questionnaires for bipolar disorder, and it has been translated into more than a dozen languages.

== Development ==
The MDQ was developed as a screening tool for bipolar disorder, and assesses symptoms of mania and hypomania It was developed in the hopes that it would reduce the mis-diagnosis and delayed diagnosis of bipolar disorder. The first 13 items on the measure ask about any manic/hypomanic symptoms that may have occurred during one's lifetime. These items are based on the DSM-IV criteria for bipolar disorder. Additional items then ask if these symptoms have happened during the same period of time (an "episode"), and how severely these symptoms affected functioning (assessing impairment). In developing this tool, the MDQ was administered to a group of bipolar patients to assess feasibility and face validity, leading to revision of the items. Following this initial study, researchers have assessed psychometric properties of the MDQ, finding that the measure possesses adequate internal consistency. The measure has also demonstrated fair sensitivity in several studies, although sensitivity may be greater in inpatient versus community settings. First built for use in adults, it has been translated into many languages and tested in a range of different settings. Researchers also have studied whether parents could use this to provide useful information about their child or adolescent. Meta-analyses have found that the MDQ is one of the best self-report tools for assessing hypomania or mania in adults, and the parent report version is one of the three best options available for parents to use about their children.

== Limitations ==
One limitation of the MDQ is that it has shown higher sensitivity when detecting bipolar I compared to other bipolar spectrum disorders. It is much less sensitive to bipolar II, often missing more than half of the cases with this diagnosis when using the recommended algorithm. Additionally, the sensitivity and specificity of the MDQ has been shown to differ by the use of a standard vs. modified cutoff (i.e., simplifies the cutoff to be based only on symptom endorsement, rather than impairment). Sensitivity and specificity of the MDQ also depend on study inclusion and exclusion criteria. Including more severe cases will increase the apparent sensitivity, because it is more likely that they will have high scores. Including healthy controls or people who are not seeking services will exaggerate the specificity of the test, as these individuals are unlikely to have manic symptoms and will score very low on the measure as a result.

Another major limitation of the MDQ is that it is not to be sensitive to treatment effects. It asks about lifetime history of symptoms, which is a strength for screening and detection, but a weakness for measuring the current severity of mood symptoms. The MDQ also uses a yes/no format for the symptoms, rather than asking about the severity of each. Other rating scales are more useful for measuring severity and treatment outcomes.

Additionally, self-report measures have some disadvantages, including bias that can stem from social desirability and demand characteristics.

== See also ==
- Bipolar disorder
- Bipolar disorder research
- Bipolar disorder in children
- List of diagnostic classification and rating scales used in psychiatry
- Hypomania Checklist
- General Behavior Inventory
- Child Mania Rating Scale
- Young Mania Rating Scale
