= Hypomania Checklist =

Diagnostic questionnaire in psychology

- Purpose: Identify hypomanic features in individuals with major depressive disorder

The Hypomania Checklist (HCL-32) is a questionnaire developed by Dr. Jules Angst to identify hypomanic features in patients with major depressive disorder in order to help recognize bipolar II disorder and other bipolar spectrum disorders when people seek help in primary care and other general medical settings. It asks about 32 behaviors and mental states that are either aspects of hypomania or features associated with mood disorders. It uses short phrases and simple language, making it easy to read. The University of Zurich holds the copyright, and the HCL-32 is available for use at no charge. More recent work has focused on validating translations and testing whether shorter versions still perform well enough to be helpful clinically. Recent meta-analyses find that it is one of the most accurate assessments available for detecting hypomania, doing better than other options at recognizing bipolar II disorder.

== Development and history ==
The Hypomania Checklist was built as a more efficient screening measure for hypomania, to be used both in epidemiological research and in clinical use. Existing measures for bipolar disorder focused on identifying personality factors and symptom severity instead of the episodic nature of hypomania or the possible negative consequences in behavioral, affective, or cognitive changes associated. These measures were mostly used in non-clinical populations to identify individuals at risk and were not used as screening instruments. The HCL-32 is a measure intended to have high sensitivity to direct clinicians from many countries to diagnosing individuals in a clinical population with bipolar disorder, specifically bipolar II disorder.

Initially developed by Jules Angst and Thomas Meyer in German, the questionnaire was translated into English and translated back to German to ensure accuracy. The English version of the HCL has been used as the basis for translation in other languages through the same process. The original study that used the HCL in an Italian and a Swiss sample noted the measure's high sensitivity and a lower sensitivity than other used measures.

The scale includes a checklist of 32 possible symptoms of hypomania, each rated yes or no. The rating "yes" would mean the symptom is present or this trait is "typical of me," and "no" would mean that the symptom is not present or "not typical" for the person.

== Limitations ==
The HCL suffers from the same problems as other self-report inventories, in that scores can be easily exaggerated or minimized by the person completing them. Like all questionnaires, the way the instrument is administered can influence the final score. If a patient is asked to fill out the form in front of other people in a clinical environment, for instance, social expectations may elicit a different response compared to administration via a postal survey.

Similar reliability scores were found when only using 16 item assessments versus the traditional 32-item format of the HCL-32. A score of at least 8 items was found valid and reliable for distinguishing Bipolar Disorder and Major Depressive Disorder. In a study, 73% of patients who completed the HCL-32 R1 were true bipolar cases identified as potential bipolar cases. However, the HCL-32 R1 does not accurately differentiate between Bipolar I and Bipolar II. However, the 16-item HCL has not been tested as a standalone section in a hospital setting. In addition, while the HCL-32 is a sensitive instrument for hypomanic symptoms, it does not distinguish between bipolar I and bipolar-II disorders. The HCL-32 has not been compared with other commonly used screening tools for bipolar disorder, such as the Young Mania Rating Scale and the General Behavior Inventory. The online version of the HCL has been shown to be as reliable as the paper version.

== See also ==
- Bipolar disorder
- Bipolar disorder in children
- Young Mania Rating Scale
- Child Mania Rating Scale
- Diagnostic classification and rating scales used in psychiatry
