= Rapport Therapeutics =

American biotechnology company

Rapport Therapeutics, Inc.
- Type: Public
- Traded as: Nasdaq: RAPP
- Industry: Biotechnology
- Founded: February 2022; 4 years ago
- Headquarters: Boston, Massachusetts, United States
- Key people: Abraham N. Ceesay (CEO)
- Website: www.rapportrx.com

Rapport Therapeutics, Inc. is an American biotechnology company based in Boston, Massachusetts. Established in 2022, it develops experimental drugs for neurological and psychiatric disorders. Its main drug candidate, RAP-219, is being studied for epilepsy and bipolar disorder.

Its shares began trading on the Nasdaq in June 2024 under the symbol RAPP.

== History ==
Rapport was incorporated in February 2022 under the name Precision Neuroscience NewCo. Its research originated from work carried out at Janssen Pharmaceuticals, a subsidiary of Johnson & Johnson. The company was formally launched in March 2023 with $100 million in Series A funding.

In August 2023, Rapport raised another $150 million in a Series B funding round led by Cormorant Asset Management. The investors included divisions of Fidelity Investments and Goldman Sachs, alongside some of the company's earlier backers.

== Research and clinical trials ==
Rapport's research concerns proteins that regulate the activity of receptors in the central nervous system. The company has concentrated much of its clinical research on RAP-219, a compound that acts on AMPA receptors through the associated protein TARP γ8.

=== Epilepsy ===
RAP-219 has been investigated as a treatment for focal-onset seizures which begin in one area of the brain. In September 2025, Rapport released results from an open-label Phase 2 study involving 30 patients whose seizures had not been adequately controlled by existing treatments.

The results exceeded analysts' expectations, and the company's share price rose sharply following their announcement.

=== Bipolar disorder ===
Rapport also studied RAP-219 in patients experiencing manic episodes associated with bipolar I disorder. In October 2026, it reported results from a randomized Phase 2 trial involving 253 participants. After 3 weeks, patients receiving RAP-219 showed a 15.4-point average reduction on the Young Mania Rating Scale, compared with a 12.3-point reduction in the placebo group.

The 3.1-point difference between the treatment and placebo groups fell below the four-point improvement that Ceesay had previously described as clinically meaningful.

Following the trial, the company said it intended to consult the Food and Drug Administration about the study results and the design of further trials. Two Phase 3 studies were planned for the second half of 2027.

=== Other research programmes ===
Rapport also pursued a study of RAP-219 for diabetic peripheral neuropathic pain. In late 2024, the FDA placed the proposed trial on clinical hold and requested additional information and changes to its protocol.

The company has also worked on RAP-641, an investigational compound being developed for chronic pain and migraine. In November 2026, Rapport reported that the FDA had cleared its application to begin clinical testing of the drug.
