= Kiddie Schedule for Affective Disorders and Schizophrenia =

- Purpose: early diagnosis of affective disorders

The Kiddie Schedule for Affective Disorders and Schizophrenia (K-SADS) is a semi-structured interview aimed at early diagnosis of affective disorders such as depression, bipolar disorder, and anxiety disorder. There are different versions of the test that have use different versions of diagnostic criteria, cover somewhat different diagnoses and use different rating scales for the items. All versions are structured to include interviews with both the child and the parents or guardians, and all use a combination of screening questions and more comprehensive modules to balance interview length and thoroughness.

The K-SADS serves to diagnose childhood mental disorders in school-aged children 6–18. The different adaptations of the K-SADS were written by different researchers and are used to screen for many affective and psychotic disorders. Versions of the K-SADS are semi-structured interviews administered by health care providers or highly trained clinical researchers, which gives more flexibility to the interviewer about how to phrase and probe items, while still covering a consistent set of disorders. Due to its semi-structured interview format, time to complete the administration varies based on the youth/adult being interviewed. Most versions of the K-SADS also include "probes", if these are endorsed, another diagnostic category will be reviewed. If the probe is not endorsed, additional symptoms for that particular disorder will not be queried.

The K-SADS has been found to be reliable and valid in multiple research and treatment settings.

== Versions ==
=== KSADS-Present Version (KSADS-P) ===
The KSADS-P was the first version of the K-SADS, developed by Chambers and Puig-Antich in 1978 as a version of the Schedule for Affective Disorders and Schizophrenia adapted for use with children and adolescents 6–19 years old. This version rephrased the SADS to make the wording of the questionnaire pertain to a younger age group. For example, mania symptoms in children might be manifest differently than in adulthood (e.g., children might have not have the same opportunity to spend money impulsively, nor would they likely have access to credit cards or checking accounts; instead, they might give away all their favorite toys or empty their parent's wallet to gain spending money). The KSADS-P is a structured interview given by trained clinicians or clinical researchers who interview both the child and the parent. This original version assesses symptoms that have occurred in the most current episode (within the week preceding the interview), as well as symptoms that have occurred within the last 12 months. The KSADS-P has many limitations: it does not assess lifetime symptoms and history, does not include many psychiatric diagnoses of interest in childhood (such as autistic spectrum disorders), and does not include diagnosis specific impairment ratings.

=== KSADS-Present and Lifetime Version (KSADS-PL) ===
The K-SADS-PL is used to screen for affective and psychotic disorders as well as other disorders, including, but not limited to Major Depressive Disorder, Mania, Bipolar Disorders, Schizophrenia, Schizoaffective Disorder, Generalized Anxiety, Obsessive Compulsive Disorder, Attention Deficit Hyperactivity Disorder, Conduct Disorder, Anorexia Nervosa, Bulimia, and Post-Traumatic Stress Disorder. This semi-structured interview takes 45–75 minutes to administer. It was written by Joan Kaufman, Boris Birmaher, David Brent, Uma Rao, and Neal Ryan. The majority of items in the K-SADS-PL are scored using a 0–3 point rating scale. Scores of 0 indicate no information is available; scores of 1 suggest the symptom is not present; scores of 2 indicate sub-threshold presentation and scores of 3 indicate threshold presentation of symptoms. The KSADS-PL has six components:

Unstructured Introductory Interview – Developmental History
The first part of the interview asks about developmental history and the history of the presenting problem. The interviewer takes detailed notes on the record sheet. Prompts cover basic demographic information, physical and mental health history and prior treatments, current complaints, and the youth’s relations with friends, family, school, and hobbies. This section allows flexibility for the interviewer to collect more information on questions that need elaboration.
Diagnostic Screening Interview
The diagnostic screening interview reviews the most severe current and past symptoms. There are probes and scoring criteria for each symptom presented. Symptoms of disorders are grouped into modules. If the patient does not display any current or past symptoms for the screening questions, then the rest of the module's questions do not need to be asked.
Completion Checklist Supplement
A supplemental checklist is used to screen for additional disorders.
Appropriate Diagnostic Supplements
These supplements review presence/absence of symptoms for other disorders, including anxiety disorders, behavioral disorders, and substance abuse.
Summary Lifetime Diagnosis Checklist
Based on the previous sections, this section summarizes which disorders have been present from first episode to now.
Children's Global Assessment Scale (C-GAS)
Scores the child’s level of functioning.

=== KSADS-Epidemiological (KSADS-E) ===
The KSADS-E, which is the epidemiological version of the KSADS, is a tool to interview parents about possible psychopathology in children from preschool onward. It was developed by Puig-Antich, Orvaschel, Tabrizi, and Chambers in 1980 as a structured interview. The tool examines both past and current episodes, focusing on the most severe past episode and the most current episode. However, this tool does not rate symptom severity; it should only be used to assess presence or absence of symptomatology. This version of the K-SADS introduced screening questions, which, if negative, allowed skipping the remaining diagnostic probes. Furthermore, the K-SADS-E also includes “skip out” criteria when assessing other diagnostic disorders (ADHD, PTSD, etc.), allowing those that screen positive to immediately be interviewed for all of the symptoms regarding that diagnosis, and those that screened negative could “skip out” of being interviewed on the remaining symptoms.

=== WASH-U-KSADS ===
The WASH-U version of the K-SADS was written by Barbara Geller and colleagues in 1996. It is a modified version of the 1986 K-SADS. This version is like many other versions of the K-SADS in that it is semi-structured, administered by clinicians to both parent and child separately, and assesses present episodes. However, this version specifically expands the mania section in order to be more applicable to pre-pubertal mania. In particular, it queries presence/absence of rapid cycling. It also includes a section on multiple other DSM-IV diagnoses, and examines both present and lifetime symptoms as well as symptom onset and offset items. These modifications made this specific version particularly useful for phenomenology studies.

=== KSADS-PL-Plus and KSADS-PLW ===
Two large grants funded by the National Institute of Mental Health combined modules of the KSADS-PL and the WASH-U-KSADS. Specifically, both projects used the depression and mania modules of the WASH-U version, combined with the rest of the modules of the PL. The few questions that the PL included about depression or mania that were not already part of the corresponding WASH-U module were added, as well, and a written map for converting item scores was included in the first grant proposal—before data collection. This provided a cross-walk so that the items and diagnoses produced using the hybrid interview would be fully compatible with data produced by other projects using the standard PL or WASH-U versions.

=== KSADS-5 ===
With the release of the fifth edition of the Diagnostic and Statistical Manual of the American Psychiatric Association (DSM-5), a team of authors completed a major revision of the KSADS. The updated version is intended to be fully aligned with DSM-5, and includes changes in symptoms and organization of symptoms (e.g., in the trauma section, with post-traumatic stress disorder), changes in the diagnostic summary criteria (e.g., adding mixed hypomania and mixed depression to the mood disorders sections), and changes in the diagnostic labels (e.g., renaming "Not Otherwise Specified" disorders "Other Specified and Related Disorders). Notably, it also added a module on pervasive developmental disorders, with coverage of autistic spectrum and related disorders, and the DMDD diagnosis (which was not adopted in the later 11th revision of the World Health Organization International Classification of Diseases, ICD-11). The KSADS-5 continues to be distributed online, free for use by private clinicians and nonprofit organizations. It is also readily available for use in industry-sponsored trials.

=== KSADS-COMP ===
Through a series of NIH grants, three web-based KSADS-COMP assessment tools were created: 1) a clinician-administered version; 2) youth self-administered version with videoclips to facilitate completion; and 3) a parent/caregiver self-administered version. The KSADS-COMPs maintained the structure of the KSADS-PL interview described above, assess about ~50 DSM-5 psychiatric diagnoses, and provides ICD-10 diagnostic codes.

The web-based KSADS-COMPs have many advantages over the paper-and-pencil versions of the scale, including: 1) Administration time of the clinician-administered interview is cut in half, clinician-training time is less, and there is much greater inter-rater reliability in scoring individual symptoms; 2) The self-administered versions of the KSADS-COMP can be completed independently in-person or remotely; 3) The KSADS-COMPs have automated selection of supplements and automated scoring and algorithms for generating diagnoses; 4) The KSADS-COMPs generate categorical diagnoses and dimensional symptom ratings; 5) Symptom level and diagnostic reports are available in real time; and 6) There are automated data capture features. The KSADS-COMP is currently available in English, Spanish, Korean, Dutch, and Danish, and several other translations are currently under development. For further information or to try a KSADS-COMP demo go to www.ksads-comp.com.

=== KSADS Mania Rating Scale (KMRS) and Depression Rating Scale (KDRS) ===
It also is possible to use the items in the mania and depression modules of some versions of the KSADS to get an interview-based rating of the severity of mood problems. The KMRS and KDRS use a 1 to 6 rating format (the same as in the WASH-U, -P, and PL-Plus versions). Adding up the items provides a measure of the total symptom burden. The KMRS assess 21 symptoms related to mania, hypomania, and rapid cycling. Each item is rated on a 0-6 rating scale. Scores of 0 suggest no information is available (missing data); scores of 1 suggest the symptom is not present at all; scores of 2 suggest the symptom is slightly present; scores of 3 suggest the symptom is mildly severe; scores of 4 suggest the symptom is moderately severe; scores of 5 suggest the symptom is severe; and scores of 6 suggest the symptom is extremely severe. Items with scores of 4 or higher are clinically significant/problematic. Trained clinicians or clinical researchers administer the assessment to both the child and the parent, which each provide their own separate score for each item (P and C), and the total score encompasses the sum of all of the items (S).

The KMRS is an alternative the Mania Rating Scale designed by Young et al. (frequently referred to as the YMRS). The YMRS is more well-known and widely used, but because it was written in 1978, it does not include all of the symptoms of mania from ICD-9 or ICD-10 (nor DSM-IV or DSM-5), as it predated them all. The YMRS was also designed for completion by nurses at the end of their eight-hour shift on an inpatient unit, observing adult patients. The KMRS has several advantages in comparison: It covers all the symptoms used in current versions of ICD and DSM, it was designed for use with children and teenagers, and it was written and validated as an interview. Studies have found excellent internal consistency and inter-rater reliability, as well as exceptionally high correlation with the YMRS. Similarly, the KDRS would be analogous to the Child Depression Rating Scale-Revised. The CDRS-R was also designed to be done as an interview, but the item content predates the current ICD and DSM and omits some important symptoms. The KDRS also shows strong reliability (internal consistency and inter-rater) and exceptionally high correlations with the KDRS.

Links to Scales

K-SADS Depression Rating Scale & K-SADS Mania Rating Scale

Kiddie Mania Rating Scale Follow-Up

== Development and history ==
The Schedule for Affective Disorders and Schizophrenia for School Aged Children, or K-SADS, was originally created as an adapted version of the Schedule for Affective Disorders and Schizophrenia, a measure for adults. The K-SADS was written by Chambers, Puig-Antich, et al. in the late 1970s. The K-SADS was developed to promote earlier diagnosis of affective disorders and schizophrenia in children in a way that incorporates reports by both the child and parent and a “summary score” by the interviewer based on observations and teacher ratings.

The first version of the K-SADS differed from other tests on children because it relied on answers to interview questions rather than observances during games and interactions. The 1990s led to the creation of different versions of the K-SADS for different purposes, such as ascertaining lifetime diagnoses (K-SADS-E) or focusing on current episodes (K-SADS-P).

== Impact ==
The K-SADS is used to measure previous and current symptoms of affective, anxiety, psychotic, and disruptive behavior disorders. The K-SADS has become one of the most widely used diagnostic interviews in research, particular for projects focused on mood disorders.

The K-SADS-PL has been written and translated into over 30 different languages, including Korean, Hebrew, Turkish, Icelandic, and Persian. The K-SADS-PL is also available in several Indian dialects including Kannada, Marathi, Tamil and Telugu.

== Limitations ==
One limitation of the K-SADS is that it requires extensive training to give properly, including observation techniques, score calibration, and re-checks to test inter-rater reliability.

== External resources ==
PDFs of the KSADS-5 are available from the Child and Adolescent Bipolar Services clinic at the University of Pittsburgh Medical Center. They have the KSADS, KMRS, KDRS, and other tools they helped develop linked here.

The KSADS-5 is a set of modules. Not every patient requires every module—the screen and summary diagnostic checklists would be the minimum. However, all seven pieces should be available for any given interview.

KSADS-PL DSM 5 Screen Interview

Supplement #1 Depressive and Bipolar Related Disorders

Supplement #2 Schizophrenia Spectrum and Other Psychotic Disorders

Supplement #3 Anxiety, Obsessive Compulsive, and Trauma-Related Disorders

Supplement #4 Neurodevelopmental, Disruptive, and Conduct Disorders

Supplement #5 Eating Disorders and Substance-Related Disorders

Summary Diagnostic Checklists

The computer-assisted version is commercially distributed here.

Links to Severity Scales

K-SADS Depression Rating Scale & K-SADS Mania Rating Scale

Kiddie Mania Rating Scale Follow-Up

== See also ==
- Child Mania Rating Scale
- Bipolar disorder in children
- Childhood schizophrenia
