= MDQ =

MDQ may refer to:

- Astor Piazzolla International Airport (IATA designator MDQ), Mar del Plata in Argentina
- Mbole language (ISO 639:mdq), a Bantu language of the Democratic Republic of the Congo
- Mood Disorder Questionnaire, a self-report questionnaire designed to help detect bipolar disorder
- Mother's Day Quarry, a Diplodocus fossil site in Montana
- Quito Metro (in Spanish, Metro de Quito), a Metro system that opened in the Ecuadorian capital in 2023
