= Bipolar disorder not otherwise specified =

Bipolar disorder NOS
- Other names: Bipolar disorder, unspecified
- Specialty: Psychiatry
- Treatment: Medication, psychotherapy
- Medication: Lithium, antipsychotics, anticonvulsants
- Frequency: 1.4%

Bipolar disorder not otherwise specified (BD-NOS) is a diagnosis for bipolar disorder (BD) when it does not fall within the other established sub-types. Bipolar disorder NOS is sometimes referred to as subthreshold bipolar disorder.

== Classification ==
BD-NOS is a mood disorder and one of four subtypes on the bipolar spectrum, which also includes bipolar I disorder, bipolar II disorder, and cyclothymia. BD-NOS was a classification in the DSM-IV and has since been changed to Bipolar "Other Specified" and "Unspecified" in the 2013 released DSM-5 (American Psychiatric Association, 2013). BD-NOS is a disorder which creates intense mood instability which causes bouts of depression, hypomania, and mania, and occasionally mood stability.

== Diagnosis ==
Bipolar disorder is difficult to diagnose. If a person displays some symptoms of bipolar disorder but not others, the clinician may diagnose bipolar NOS. The diagnosis of bipolar NOS is indicated when there is a rapid change (days) between manic and depressive symptoms and can also include recurring episodes of hypomania. Bipolar NOS may be diagnosed when it is difficult to tell whether bipolar is the primary disorder due to another general medical condition, such as a substance use disorder. A diagnosis of this condition can be challenging and is often imprecise.

People with bipolar NOS and bipolar I disorder have similar symptom and family history profiles. Children and youth with bipolar NOS are at high risk to develop bipolar I disorder or bipolar II disorder as they age.

== Treatment ==
Individual approaches to treatment are recommended, usually involving a combination of mood stabilizers and atypical antipsychotics. Psychotherapy may be beneficial and should be started early.

== Epidemiology ==
The prevalence of BD-NOS is 1.4%. The prevalence of the larger category of bipolar spectrum disorder has been estimated to be as high as 6% of the population.

== See also ==
- Bipolar disorder
- Bipolar I disorder
- Bipolar II disorder
- Cyclothymia
- International Society for Bipolar Disorders
- Outline of bipolar disorder
- Bipolar disorders research
- Borderline personality disorder
- Emotional dysregulation
- List of people with bipolar disorder
- Mood (psychology)
- Mood swing
- Ultradian bipolar disorder
