= Bipolar disorder in children =

Comparison of bipolar disorder subtypes: Bipolar I, Bipolar II, and Cyclothymia

Bipolar disorder in children, or pediatric bipolar disorder (PBD), is a mental disorder characterized by mood episodes similar to those experienced by adults with bipolar disorder. The diagnosis of bipolar disorder in children has been heavily debated due to concerns about diagnostic criteria and the effects of treatment on young patients still in development.

PBD has been proposed as an explanation for periods of extreme mood swings, called mood episodes. These episodes alternate between depression or irritability and highly elevated moods, called manic or hypomanic episodes. Mixed mood episodes can occur when someone with PBD experiences depressive and manic symptoms simultaneously. PBD mood episodes differ from general mood swings experienced by children and adolescents, as mood episodes may persist over an extended period of several weeks or years, and may cause severe disruptions to an individual's life.

There are three known forms of PBD: bipolar I, bipolar II, and bipolar disorder not otherwise specified (BD-NOS). The average age of onset of PBD remains unclear; reported ages range from 5 to 19 years. PBD is typically more severe and has a poorer prognosis than cases of bipolar disorder with onset in late adolescence or adulthood.

Since 1980, the DSM has specified that the criteria for bipolar disorder in adults can also apply to children, with some adjustments based on developmental differences. Genetics and environment are considered risk factors for the development of bipolar disorder; however, the specific cause is currently unknown. Like bipolar disorder, diagnosis of PBD requires professional evaluation and often extensive observation, as children may not articulate their symptoms as reliably or as accurately as adults.

== Causes ==
While understanding of the development of bipolar disorder is limited, research shows that there are many environmental and biological risk factors. Family history is a strong predictor of the development of bipolar disorder in childhood, with genetics contributing to risk by up to 50%. However, family history does not lead to a certain diagnosis of PBD in a child. Only 6% of children with parents diagnosed with bipolar disorder also have the disorder. Still, children of parents with bipolar disorder should be monitored, especially if they exhibit sleep disturbances and symptoms of anxiety disorders early on. Other factors that can contribute to PBD include substance use disorder and childhood adversity, such as abuse or trauma at school.

== Diagnosis ==
Diagnosis is based on a clinical interview conducted by a licensed mental health professional. Bipolar disorder cannot be diagnosed using blood tests or imaging. PBD can be difficult to diagnose, especially in children under 11–12 years of age, as they may be unable to accurately self-assess and communicate their symptoms. Therefore, it is helpful to obtain information from multiple sources, such as family members and teachers, and to use questionnaires and checklists for a more accurate diagnosis. Commonly used assessment tools include the K-SADS (Kiddie Schedule for Affective Disorders and Schizophrenia), the Diagnostic Interview Schedule for Children (DISC), and the Child Mania Rating Scale (CMRS). It is important to assess the child's baseline mood and behavior and determine whether symptoms occur episodically. Parents are often encouraged to keep mood logs to assist with this. Family history is also important to obtain because bipolar disorder can be heritable. Medication use, substance use, and other medical problems should be ruled out to diagnose bipolar disorder accurately.

Early diagnosis and treatment of PBD contribute to better outcomes. Anxiety disorders and sleep disturbances often precede mood symptoms. If a child presents with these symptoms alongside major changes in energy and deterioration in functioning, especially at school, this may warrant evaluation for PBD.

It can be difficult to distinguish PBD from other conditions such as ADHD, OCD, autism spectrum disorder, depression, anxiety, and conduct disorders because of overlapping symptoms. Common symptoms of PBD and ADHD include irritability, distractibility, and poor judgment. Elated mood and decreased need for sleep can be particularly indicative of PBD.

=== Signs and symptoms ===
The American Psychiatric Association's DSM-5 and the World Health Organization's ICD-10 use the same diagnostic criteria for bipolar disorder in adults and children, with some adjustments to account for differences in age and developmental stages, particularly for depressive episodes. For example, the DSM-5 specifies that children may exhibit a persistently irritable mood instead of a depressed mood. Additionally, children are more likely to fail to meet the expected body weight criterion instead of presenting with weight loss.

In diagnosing manic episodes, it is important to compare changes in mood and behavior with the child's baseline mood and behavior instead of with those of other children or adults. For example, grandiosity, which is an unrealistic overestimation of one's intelligence, talent, or abilities, can occur to varying degrees during childhood and adolescence. Therefore, grandiosity is only considered symptomatic of mania in children when the beliefs are held despite being presented with concrete evidence otherwise, when they lead to a child attempting activities that are clearly dangerous, and, most importantly, when the beliefs are an obvious change from a child's baseline self-image.

It is important to determine whether irritability is related to bipolar disorder or another condition, as it is common in other childhood disorders. If irritability is persistent, it is important to differentiate it from the chronic irritability seen in disruptive mood dysregulation disorder (DMDD).

PBD and ADHD, in particular, have many overlapping symptoms, such as the hyperactivity characteristic of manic episodes. Many children and adolescents with PBD are misdiagnosed as having ADHD. Misdiagnosis can lead to complications, as some medications used to treat other disorders can exacerbate symptoms of PBD.

==== Manic episodes include ====
- Elevated mood (or increased silliness in children)
- Rapid speech that is difficult to interrupt
- Decreased need for sleep
- Racing thoughts
- Increased interests in or participation in activities (especially those considered more reckless)
- Inflated sense of ability

==== Depressive episodes include ====
- Frequent and unprovoked sadness
- Physical pain (stomachaches, headaches)
- Sleeping more
- Difficulty concentrating
- Feelings of worthlessness or hopelessness
- Changes in eating habits

=== Subtypes ===
According to the DSM-5, there are three subtypes of bipolar disorder: bipolar I, bipolar II, and bipolar disorder not otherwise specified (BD-NOS). As in adults, bipolar I is the most severe form of PBD; it can impair sleep and general functioning and can lead to hospitalization. BD-NOS is the mildest form of PBD. The criteria for distinguishing subtypes are the same as those for bipolar disorder in adults.

=== Controversy ===
The diagnosis of childhood bipolar disorder has been heavily debated. It is recognized that the typical symptoms of bipolar disorder are dysfunctional and have negative consequences for minors with the condition. The main discussion centers on whether what is called bipolar disorder in children is the same as adult bipolar disorder and whether the criteria for diagnosing adults are useful and accurate for children. There are also questions about how mania differs between children and adults.

There are significant differences in how commonly PBD is diagnosed across clinics and between countries. In the United States, there were concerns about the overdiagnosis and misdiagnosis of PBD. Increased understanding and research led to a decrease in PBD diagnoses from the mid-2000s through 2010.

== Management ==
A combination of medication and psychosocial intervention is recommended for most children with PBD. This combination has been proven to lead to improved prognosis. Choosing the appropriate treatment involves considering the child's age, psychosocial environment, presentation and severity of symptoms, and family history.

=== Medication ===
Mood stabilizers, which help manage manic episodes, and atypical antipsychotics, which help manage both manic and depressive episodes, have been demonstrated to be the safest and most effective treatments for PBD. Mood stabilizers used to treat PBD include lithium, valproic acid, divalproex sodium, carbamazepine, and lamotrigine. Lithium is FDA-approved for those 12 years and older and appears to be particularly effective in children with a family history of mood disorders, especially if family members have been successfully treated with lithium. Atypical antipsychotics FDA-approved for the treatment of PBD include risperidone, cariprazine, lurasidone, olanzapine-fluoxetine combination, and quetiapine. Risperidone has been approved for use in children aged 10 and older. Medications have also proved effective when combined, whether as multiple mood stabilizers or a mood stabilizer with an atypical antipsychotic.

Medications used to treat PBD can produce significant side effects, so it is recommended that patients' families be informed. Although atypical antipsychotics are more effective in treating PBD than mood stabilizers, they can cause more side effects. Typical antipsychotics may cause weight gain and other metabolic problems, including type 2 diabetes mellitus and hyperlipidemia. Extrapyramidal side effects may occur with the use of these medications, including tardive dyskinesia, a movement disorder that is difficult to treat. Liver and kidney damage may occur as a result of using mood stabilizers. Lithium overdose can also occur in individuals with low sodium levels. Pediatric patients often struggle with adherence to PBD medications, which can be improved with motivational interviewing techniques.

=== Psychotherapy ===
Psychological treatment for PBD can take several forms, such as psychoeducation, psychotherapy, and alternative treatments. Psychoeducation involves informing children with bipolar disorder and their families, in ways appropriate to their age and family role, about the different aspects of bipolar disorder and its management, including causes, signs and symptoms, and treatments. Family-focused therapy (FFT) is a therapy for both individuals with PBD and their caregivers, in which families participate in communication improvement and problem-solving skills training. Group therapy aims to improve social skills and manage group conflicts, with role-playing as a key tool. Another type of therapy used in individuals with PBD is chronotherapy, which helps children and adolescents establish healthy sleep patterns, as sleep is often disrupted by PBD symptoms. Finally, cognitive-behavioral therapy (CBT) aims to give participants a better understanding and control of their emotions and behaviors.

Psychotherapy can be tailored to each individual and address needs that medication alone cannot meet, helping to improve quality of life and functioning. Additionally, psychotherapy improves medication adherence.

Alternative treatments are currently being developed for children with PBD for whom medication and psychotherapy have proven ineffective. Currently, interventions involving dialectical behavioral therapy (DBT) are being explored because of their focus on mindfulness and distress tolerance skill building. According to the APA, studies have indicated that DBT may lead to decreased suicidal ideation compared with typical psychosocial treatments. Nutritional interventions are also currently being researched, along with other lifestyle modifications, including exercise and healthy sleep habits.

== Prognosis ==
Bipolar disorder is a chronic condition that requires lifelong care and treatment. Without proper treatment, PBD often has a poor prognosis. Chronic adherence to medication is often needed, with relapse rates exceeding 90% among individuals not following medication recommendations and almost 40% in those complying with medication regimens in some studies. Other risk factors for poor outcomes of PBD and increased severity of symptoms are comorbid pathologies and early onset of disease.

Children with PBD, especially those with early onset, are more likely to die by suicide than other children, as well as misuse alcohol and/or other drugs. Studies have shown that among adolescents with PBD, 44% have a lifetime history of suicide attempts, twice the rate reported among teens diagnosed with major depressive disorder. Children and adolescents with PBD are also at increased risk of behavior that can result in incarceration.

Hypomanic episodes in adolescents have been shown not always to progress to adult bipolar disorder. However, research on PBD emphasizes the importance of early diagnosis for improved prognosis.

== Comorbid conditions ==
The most common comorbidities seen with PBD are ADHD (80%) and oppositional defiant disorder (47%). Between 13.2% and 29% of patients with bipolar disorder are diagnosed with conduct disorder, substance use disorders, anxiety disorders, or borderline personality disorder.

Comorbid ADHD can be diagnosed if symptoms such as hyperactivity and distractibility are persistent. If they are only episodic, this is likely a symptom of PBD. Therefore, it is important to carefully evaluate the onset of symptoms and how long they have been present. While difficulty sleeping can be present in both, patients with bipolar disorder typically have a decreased need for sleep during manic episodes, whereas children with ADHD have sleep problems with increased fatigue. Grandiosity is also a distinguishing factor: mania typically presents with increased self-esteem, while children with ADHD may have lower self-esteem.

== Epidemiology ==
Globally, the prevalence of PBD is estimated at 3.9% in 2019. However, five surveys from Brazil, England, Turkey, and the United States reported pre-adolescent rates of PBD as zero or close to zero.

The increase of PBD diagnoseses in the United States is attributed to the cohort effect (shared circumstances of more recently born children) as well as the anticipation effect (the earlier onset of genetic conditions in later generations).

== History ==
Descriptions of children with symptoms similar to contemporary concepts of mania date back to the 18th century. In 1898, a detailed psychiatric case history was published about a 13-year-old who met Jean-Pierre Falret and Jules Baillarger's criteria for folie circulaire, which is congruent with the modern conception of bipolar I disorder.

In Emil Kraepelin's descriptions of bipolar disorder in the 1920s, which he called "manic depressive insanity," he noted the rare possibility that it could occur in children. In addition to Kraepelin, Adolf Meyer, Karl Abraham, and Melanie Klein were some of the first to document bipolar disorder symptoms in children in the first half of the 20th century. It was not mentioned much in the English-language literature until the 1970s, when interest in researching the subject increased. It became more accepted as a diagnosis in children in the 1980s after the DSM-III (1980) specified that the same criteria for diagnosing bipolar disorder in adults could also be applied to children.

Recognition came twenty years later, with epidemiological studies showing that approximately 20% of adults with bipolar disorder had already experienced symptoms in childhood or adolescence. Nevertheless, onset before age 10 was thought to be rare, occurring in fewer than 0.5% of cases. During the second half of the century, misdiagnosis as schizophrenia was common among the non-adult population due to the common co-occurrence of psychosis and mania. This issue diminished with increased adherence to the DSM criteria in the latter part of the 20th century.

== See also ==
- Outline of bipolar disorder
