= Annales médico-psychologiques =

- Discipline: Psychiatry
- Language: French
- Edited by: Aimé Charles-Nicolas

Publication details
- History: 1843–present
- Publisher: Elsevier on behalf of the Société médico-psychologique (France)
- Frequency: 10/year
- Impact factor: 0.222 (2017)

Standard abbreviations
- ISO 4: Ann. Méd.-Psychol.

Indexing
- CODEN: AMPYAT
- ISSN: 0003-4487
- OCLC no.: 471520985

Links
- Journal homepage; Online archive

The Annales médico-psychologiques is a peer-reviewed medical journal covering the field of psychiatry. It was established in 1843 and is published by Elsevier on behalf of the Société médico-psychologique. Articles are published in French with abstracts in English. The editor-in-chief is Aimé Charles Nicolas (Centre Hospitalier Universitaire de Martinique).

== Abstracting and indexing ==
The journal is abstracted and indexed in:

- EBSCO databases
- Embase
- Modern Language Association Database
- PASCAL
- PsycINFO
- Science Citation Index Expanded
- Scopus

According to the Journal Citation Reports, the journal has a 2017 impact factor of 0.222.
