= Ronald Braunstein =

American orchestral conductor (born 1955)

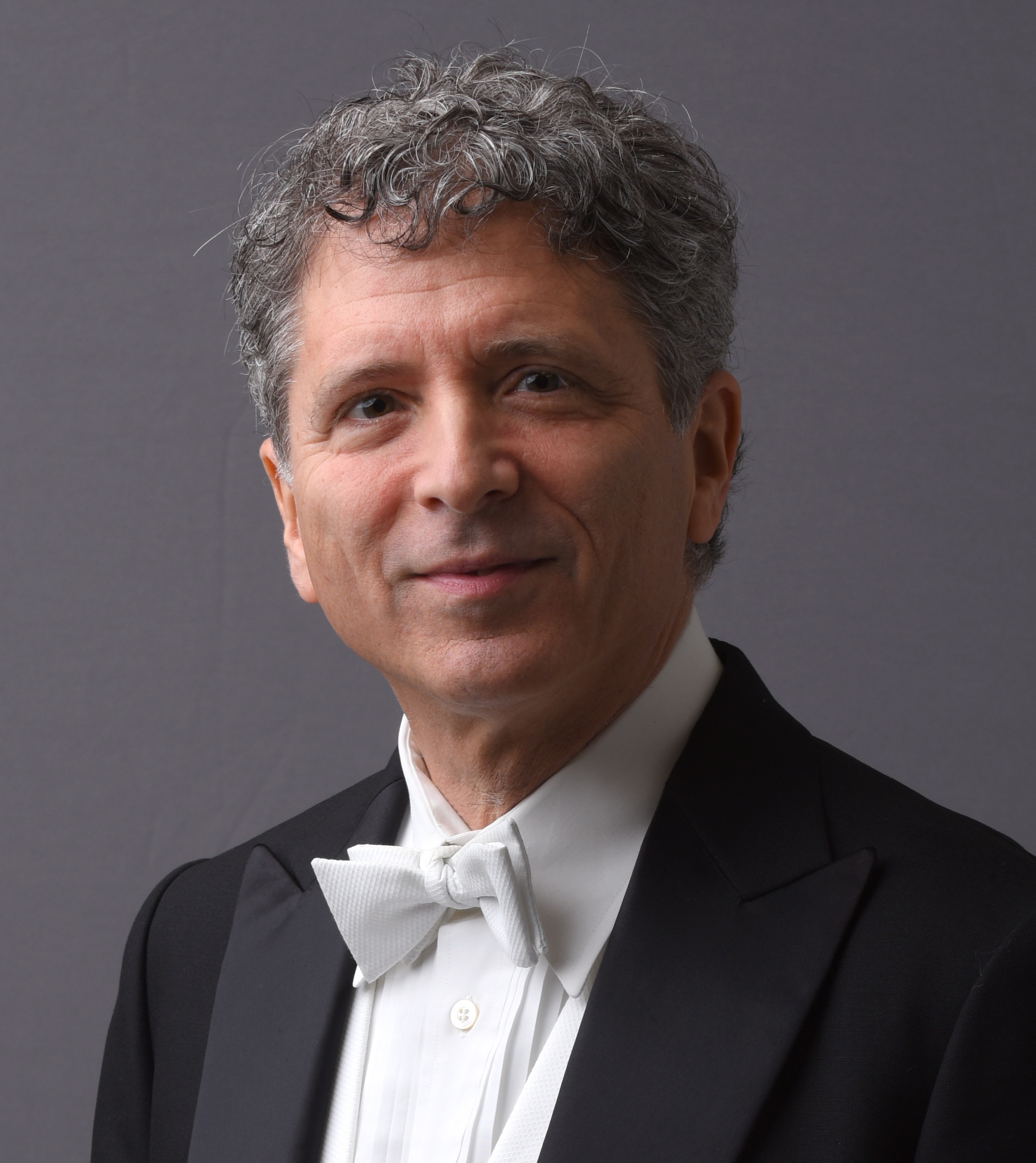
- Braunstein in 2016

Background information
- Born: Ronald Braunstein; July 27, 1955 (age 71); Shirley, Massachusetts, U.S.
- Occupations: Composer, conductor, author, lecturer
- Instruments: Piano, violin

External videos
- You may listen to Ronald Braunstein performing Ralph Vaughan Williams Fantasia on a Theme by Thomas Tallis with his Me2/Strings orchestra in 2015 here on archive.org

Ronald Braunstein (born July 27, 1955, in Shirley, Massachusetts) is an American orchestral conductor. He is currently the music director and conductor of Me2/, the world's only classical music organization created for individuals living with mental illnesses and the people who support them. He lives in Malden, Massachusetts with his wife, Caroline.

== Education ==
Braunstein was raised in Pittsburgh, Pennsylvania. As a child he played piano, and studied violin with Eugene Phillips of the Pittsburgh Symphony. As a teenager he began composing music and attended the North Carolina School of the Arts. He graduated with a diploma in music composition.

In 1973 Braunstein began his undergraduate degree at the Juilliard School of Music where he studied composition with Elliott Carter and Milton Babbitt. That same year he was awarded the BMI Student Composition Award. He then changed his course of study and graduated from Juilliard with a Bachelor of Music in conducting in 1978.

During the summers, Braunstein received further education while attending the Salzburg Mozarteum, Fontainbleau, and Tanglewood Music Center where he conducted in the masterclasses of Leonard Bernstein and Seiji Ozawa.

== Early career ==
In 1979, at the age of 23, Braunstein became the first American to win the First Prize Gold Medal in the Herbert von Karajan International Conducting Competition in Berlin. He spent several years learning from Herbert von Karajan and the Berlin Philharmonic.

The Karajan Competition launched his career. Braunstein conducted orchestras all over the world, most notably the San Francisco Symphony, Berlin Philharmonic, Stuttgart Radio Orchestra, Svizzera-Italiana Radio Orchestra, Israel Sinfonietta, Auckland Philharmonia, Kyoto Symphony, Osaka Symphony, Tokyo Symphony, the Hague Philharmonic and the Oslo Philharmonic. He also served on the conducting staff at the Juilliard School of Music and the American Opera Center.

== Me2/Orchestra ==
External videos
- You may watch Ronald Braunstein and his Me2/Orchestra performing Ottorino Respighi's Ancient Airs and Dances Suite No. 3 in 2014 here on archive.org

Braunstein was diagnosed with bipolar disorder in 1985. The ups and downs of his career often followed the ecstatic mania and devastating depression associated with this disease. In 2011, he decided to create his own ensemble that would be for people living with mental illnesses and those who support the social mission of fighting stigma.

In 2011, Braunstein and Caroline Whiddon (whom he later married) co-founded Me2/Orchestra, the world's only classical music organization specifically created for individuals with mental illnesses and the people who support them. The social mission of the organization is to fight stigma surrounding mental illness.

The first orchestra launched in Burlington, Vermont. Three years later, the organization expanded to include a full sized orchestra in Boston which became the organization's hub. In 2018, a third was formed in Manchester, NH. The organization also includes a 20 piece flute choir and choruses in Boston and Burlington.

In the years since launching Me2/, Braunstein has received international media exposure for bringing attention to mental health issues. Braunstein and Me2/ have been profiled by the New York Times, Associated Press, BBC News, and Al Jazeera America.
