= General Behavior Inventory =

Psychological assessment tool

- Purpose: identify manic mood

The General Behavior Inventory (GBI) is a 73-question psychological self-report assessment tool designed by Richard Depue and colleagues to identify the presence and severity of manic and depressive moods in adults, as well as to assess for cyclothymia. It is one of the most widely used psychometric tests for measuring the severity of bipolar disorder and the fluctuation of symptoms over time. The GBI is intended to be administered for adult populations; however, it has been adapted into versions that allow for juvenile populations (for parents to rate their offspring), as well as a short version that allows for it to be used as a screening test.

== Versions ==
General Behavior Inventory Version Development

=== General Behavior Inventory (GBI) ===
The GBI was originally made as a self-report instrument for college students and adults to use to describe their own history of mood symptoms. The original item set included clinical characteristics and associated features in addition to the diagnostic symptoms of manic and depressive states in the current versions of the Diagnostic and Statistical Manual (DSM) of the American Psychiatric Association. The first set of 69 items was increased to 73, with the final version having 73 mood items and 6 additional questions to check the validity of responses (but which did not figure in the scale scores). The self report version of the GBI has been used in an extensive program of research, accruing evidence of many facets of validity. Because of its length and high reading level, there also have been many efforts to develop short forms of the GBI.

==== 7 Up 7 Down Inventory (7U7D) ====
The 7 Up-7 Down (7U7D) is a 14-item measure of manic and depressive tendencies that was carved from the full length GBI. This version is designed to be applicable for both youths and adults, and to improve separation between both mania and depressive conditions. It was developed via factor analysis from nine separate samples pooled into two age groups, ensuring applicability for use in youth and adults.

A sleep scale also has been carved from the GBI, using the seven items that ask about anything directly related to sleep.

=== Parent report on the GBI (P-GBI) ===
The P-GBI is an adaptation of the GBI, consisting of 73 Likert scale items rated on a scale from 0 ("Never or Hardly Ever") to 3 ("Very often or Almost Constantly"). It consists of two scales: a depressive symptoms (46 items) and a hypomanic/biphasic (mixed) symptoms (28 items).

==== Parent short forms ====
Parent GBI-10-Item Mania Scale
- Synonyms: PGBI-10M
- LOINC: 62720-8

Again, due to the length of the full version, several short forms have been built and tested in multiple samples that may be more convenient to use in clinical work. These include 10 item mania, two alternate 10 item depression forms, and the seven item Sleep scale. All have performed as well or better than the self-report version when completed by an adult familiar with the youth's behavior (typically a parent).

The PGBI-10M is a brief (10-item) version of the PGBI that was validated for clinical use for patients presenting with a variety of different diagnoses, including frequent comorbid conditions. It is administered to parents for them to rate their children between ages 5–17. The 10 items include symptoms such as elated mood, high energy, irritability and rapid changes in mood and energy as indicators of potential juvenile bipolar disorder. The PhenX Toolkit uses this instrument as its child protocol for Hypomania/Mania Symptoms.

=== Teacher report on the GBI ===
One study had a large sample of teachers complete the GBI to describe the mood and behavior of youths age 5 to 18 years old. The results indicated that there were many items that teachers did not have an opportunity to observe the behavior (such as the items asking about sleep), and others that teachers often chose to skip. Even after shortening the item list to those that teachers could report about, the validity results were modest even though the internal consistency reliability was high. The results suggested that it was challenging for teachers to tell the difference between hypomanic symptoms and symptoms attributable to attention-deficit/hyperactivity disorder, which is much more common in the classroom. The results aligned with findings from a large meta-analysis that teacher report had the lowest average validity across all mania scales compared to adolescent or parent report on the same scales. Based on these results, current recommendations are to concentrate on parent and youth report, and not use teacher report as a way of measuring hypomanic symptoms in youths.

== Psychometric properties ==
This image illustrates the GBI's abilities in the three "P"s: (a) Predicting a diagnosis or criterion of importance; (b) Prescribing a specific treatment; and (c) helping us understand developmental Processes.

The GBI has been used extensively in research, including clinical samples, college students, longitudinal, treatment, and other studies. However, no normative data exist to calibrate scores in the general population.

=== Reliability ===
The GBI has very good reliability.

Evaluating scores from the General Behavior Inventory against the EBA rubric for norms and reliability
Criterion	Rating	Explanation with references
Norms	Adequate	Multiple convenience samples and research studies, including both clinical and nonclinical samples
Internal consistency	Excellent; too good for some contexts	Cronbach's alphas routinely over .94 for both scales, suggesting that scales could be shortened for many uses
Inter-rater reliability	Not applicable	Designed originally as a self-report scale; parent and youth report correlate about the same as cross-informant scores correlate in general
Test-retest reliability (stability)	Good	r = .73 over 15 weeks. Evaluated in initial studies, with data also showing high stability in clinical trials
Repeatability	Not published	No published studies formally checking repeatability

=== Validity ===
Evaluation of validity and utility for the General Behavior Inventory (table from Youngstrom et al., unpublished, extended from Hunsley & Mash, 2008; *indicates new construct or category)
Criterion	Rating	Explanation with references
Content validity	Excellent	Covers both DSM diagnostic symptoms and a range of associated features
Construct validity (e.g., predictive, concurrent, convergent, and discriminant validity)	Excellent	Shows convergent validity with other symptom scales, longitudinal prediction of development of mood disorders, criterion validity via metabolic markers and associations with family history of mood disorder. Factor structure complicated; the inclusion of "biphasic" or "mixed" mood items creates a lot of cross-loading
Discriminative validity	Excellent	Multiple studies show that GBI scores discriminate cases with unipolar and bipolar mood disorders from other clinical disorders effect sizes are among the largest of existing scales
Validity generalization	Good	Used both as self-report and caregiver report; used in college student as well as outpatient and inpatient clinical samples; translated into multiple languages with good reliability
Treatment sensitivity	Good	Multiple studies show sensitivity to treatment effects comparable to using interviews by trained raters, including placebo-controlled, masked assignment trials Short forms appear to retain sensitivity to treatment effects while substantially reducing burden
Clinical utility	Good	Free (public domain), strong psychometrics, extensive research base. Biggest concerns are length and reading level. Short forms have less research, but are appealing based on reduced burden and promising data

== Interpretation ==
=== GBI scoring ===
The current GBI questionnaire includes 73 Likert-type items which reflect symptoms of different moods. The original version of the GBI used case scoring where items were given values ranging from 1–4. Symptoms that were rated as 1 or 2 were considered to be absent and symptoms rated as 3 or 4 were considered to be present. However, if each item were to receive one of four scores, the authors of the GBI decided Likert scaling would be a better scoring option. The items on the GBI are now scaled from 0–3 rated as 0 (never or hardly ever present), 1 (sometimes present), 2 (often present), and 3 (very often or almost constantly present).

=== PGBI-10M ===
For the PGBI-10M, the scores from each question are added together to form a total score, with higher scores indicating a greater severity of symptoms. Scores range from 0 to 30. Low scores of 5 and below indicate a very low risk of a bipolar diagnosis. High scores of 18 and over indicate a high risk of a diagnosis of bipolar disorder, increasing the likelihood by a factor of seven or greater. Several peer-reviewed research studies support the P-GBI as a reliable and valid measure of bipolar in children and adolescents. It is recommended to be used as part of an assessment battery in the diagnosis of juvenile bipolar disorder.

== Limitations ==
The GBI is free for use clinically and in research. The reading level and length make it challenging for some people to complete.

== See also ==
- Bipolar disorder
- Diagnostic classification and rating scales used in psychiatry
- Rating scales for depression
