= Bipolar disorder =

Disorder of depression and mood episodes

- Other names: Bipolar affective disorder (BPAD), bipolar illness, manic depression, manic depressive disorder, manic–depressive illness (historical), manic–depressive psychosis
- Bipolar disorder is characterized by episodes of mania or hypomania and depression.
- Specialty: Psychiatry, clinical psychology
- Symptoms: Periods of depression and elevated mood
- Complications: Suicide, self harm, social, legal and financial problems, higher risk of diabetes mellitus, heart disease and STIs, cognitive impairment
- Usual onset: 20s or 40s
- Types: Bipolar I disorder, bipolar II disorder, bipolar disorder not otherwise specified, others
- Causes: Environmental and genetic
- Risk factors: Family history, child abuse, long-term stress
- Differential diagnosis: Attention deficit hyperactivity disorder, autism, personality disorders, schizophrenia, substance use disorder, post-traumatic stress disorder
- Treatment: Psychotherapy, medications
- Medication: Lithium, antipsychotics, anticonvulsants
- Frequency: 1% per 6–12 months; 1–3% lifetime
- Deaths: 11.7 times higher risk of death by suicide

Bipolar disorder (BD), previously known as manic depression, is a mental disorder characterized by periods of depression and abnormally elevated mood, lasting days to weeks, and in some cases months. If the elevated mood is severe or associated with psychosis, it is called mania; if it does not significantly affect functioning, it is called hypomania. During mania, an individual behaves or feels abnormally energetic, happy, or irritable, and often makes impulsive and reckless decisions. There is usually sleep disturbance during manic phases. During periods of depression, the individual may experience crying, have a negative outlook, and demonstrate poor eye contact. People with BD are at 11.7 times greater risk of dying by suicide than the general population, although this statistic comes from a collection of studies with high heterogeneity (94.6%). Likewise, approximately 34% attempt suicide during their lifetime but heterogeneity among studies is high (96.4%). Among adolescents with BD, 78% engaged in self-harm.

The mechanisms of this mood disorder are not clearly understood, although some studies suggest areas for future clinical research. Structural and functional MRI studies have shown differences in brain regions in BD, such as regions involved in perceiving risk-reward and regulating emotions. A systematic review and meta-analysis by Murri and others found that cortisol levels are "associated with the manic phase" of BD. Likewise, various other studies support an important role for hypothalamic-pituitary-adrenal axis (HPA axis).

Risk for BD is thought to be influenced by genetics, environment, and ADHD. In one respect (heritability), genetic factors may account for up to 70–90% of the risk of developing BD. In another respect (concordance rate), identical twins both have bipolar disorder (or both do not) at a rate of ~40%, in contrast to dizygotic twins' ~5%. Environmental risks include a history of child abuse and long-term stress. A meta-analysis and a separate critical literature review have found worse prognosis and earlier onset of BD in people with childhood maltreatment and "early emotional trauma" respectively. Likewise, traumatic bonding increases risk of BD. ADHD increases the risk of developing bipolar disorder. More research is needed to understand the nature of this association.

The condition is classified as bipolar I disorder if there has been at least one manic episode, with or without depressive episodes, and as bipolar II disorder if there has been at least one hypomanic episode (but no full manic episodes) and one major depressive episode. It is classified as cyclothymia if there are hypomanic symptoms with periods of depression that do not meet the criteria for major depressive episodes. If these symptoms are due to drugs or medical problems, they are not diagnosed as BD.

Mood stabilizers, particularly lithium, and anticonvulsants, such as lamotrigine and valproate, as well as atypical antipsychotics are used for treatment. Atypical antipsychotics are used for acute manic episodes or when mood stabilizers are ineffective or not tolerated, with long-acting injectables available for patients who struggle to maintain a medication regimen. There is evidence that psychotherapy improves the course of BD. Use of antidepressants in depressive episodes is controversial: they can be effective, but certain classes of antidepressants increase the risk of mania. The treatment of depressive episodes, therefore, is often difficult. Past studies have found that electroconvulsive therapy (ECT) is effective in acute manic and depressive episodes, particularly with psychosis or catatonia; (Note: Catatonia is a syndrome characterized by profound unresponsiveness or stupor with abnormal movements in a person who is otherwise awake.) likewise, past guidelines have recommended admission to a psychiatric hospital if someone is a risk to themselves or others, or involuntary treatment if someone refuses treatment. However, the Committee on Rights of Persons with Disabilities (CRPD) of the United Nations has recommended the abolition of institutionalization and forced treatments "such as sedatives, mood stabilizers, electro-convulsive treatment, and conversion therapy".

The 6–12 month prevalence of bipolar disorder is 1%, while the lifetime prevalence is between 1 and 3%. The prevalence of pediatric bipolar disorder is 3.9%, although study estimates are higher with "broad bipolar criteria" and "older minimum age". The most frequent ages of onset are 24 or 46; the distribution of onset age is bimodal. An earlier onset is associated with worse depression and more frequent co-diagnosis of anxiety and substance use. Around 40–60% of people with BD are employed and over 80% "may take time off work for psychiatric reasons in a five year period." Occupational therapies appear cost-effective at returning people with BD to work. Social cognition is moderately impaired in people with BD, regardless of mood state. 16% of people with BD are high functioning. As of 2021, people with BD accounted for 183 Years Lived with Disability (YLDs) per 100,000 people in the Americas (ranking 20th out of all conditions). Risk of death due to unnatural and natural causes is 7.3 and 1.9 times higher respectively. On average, life expectancy is 12.9 years shorter.

== Signs and symptoms ==
Bipolar symptoms usually begin in adolescence or early adulthood. The condition is characterized by intermittent episodes of mania, commonly (but not in everyone) alternating with bouts of depression, with an absence of symptoms in between. During these episodes, people with bipolar disorder exhibit disruptions in normal mood, psychomotor activity (the level of physical activity that is influenced by mood)—such as constant fidgeting during mania or slowed movements during depression—circadian rhythm and cognition. Mania can present with varying levels of mood disturbance, ranging from euphoria, which is associated with "classic mania", to dysphoria and irritability.

Psychotic symptoms such as delusions or hallucinations may occur in both manic and depressive episodes; their content and nature are consistent with the person's mood. Of people with bipolar I disorder, 58–68% have experienced psychosis. For context, co-diagnosis of schizophrenia is "low" in bipolar disorder (8%). For further context, psychotic symptoms are more common in bipolar type I than in bipolar type II.

In some people with bipolar disorder, depressive symptoms predominate, and the episodes of mania are always the more subdued hypomania type. According to the DSM-5 criteria, mania is distinguished from hypomania by the duration: hypomania is present if elevated mood symptoms persist for at least four consecutive days, while mania is present if such symptoms persist for more than a week. Unlike mania, hypomania is not always associated with impaired functioning.

=== Manic episodes ===
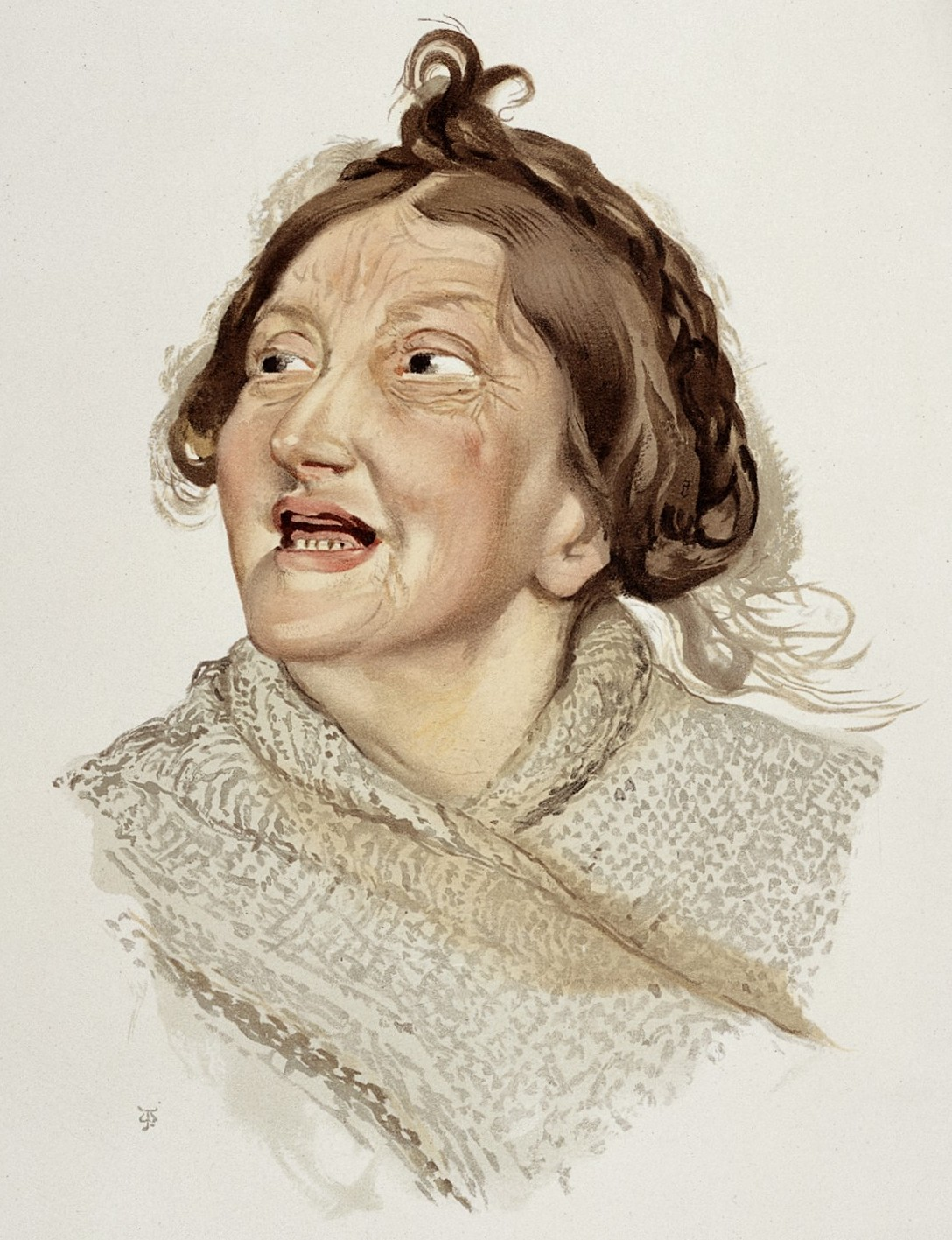
An 1892 color lithograph depicting a woman diagnosed with hilarious mania

Also known as mania, a manic episode is a period of at least one week of elevated or irritable mood, which can range from euphoria to delirium. The core symptom of mania involves an increase in energy of psychomotor activity. Mania can also present with increased self-esteem or grandiosity, racing thoughts, pressured speech that is difficult to interrupt, decreased need for sleep, disinhibited social behavior, increased goal-oriented activities and impaired judgement, which can lead to impulsive or high-risk behaviors, such as excessive spending. To fit the definition of a manic episode, these behaviors must impair the individual's ability to socialize or work. If untreated, a manic episode usually lasts three to six months.

In severe manic episodes, a person can experience psychotic symptoms, where thought content is affected along with mood. They may feel unstoppable, persecuted, or as if they have a special relationship with God, a great mission to accomplish, or other grandiose or delusional ideas. This occasionally results in hospitalization in an inpatient psychiatric hospital, but a systematic review and meta-analysis showed that bipolar disorder, by itself, does not increase criminally violent behavior. The severity of manic symptoms can be measured by rating scales such as the Young Mania Rating Scale, though questions remain about the reliability of these scales.

Authors of a chapter for a "clinical textbook" posit that mania is a medical emergency. Two other authors (Kane and Director) in the Journal of Medical Ethics have debated the medical decision-making capacity of people with mania. In a study of fifty inpatients with mania, 38% were found to have capacity to make their own treatment choices.

The onset of a manic or depressive episode is often foreshadowed by sleep disturbance. Manic individuals often have a history of substance use disorder developed over years as a form of "self-medication".

=== Hypomanic episodes ===
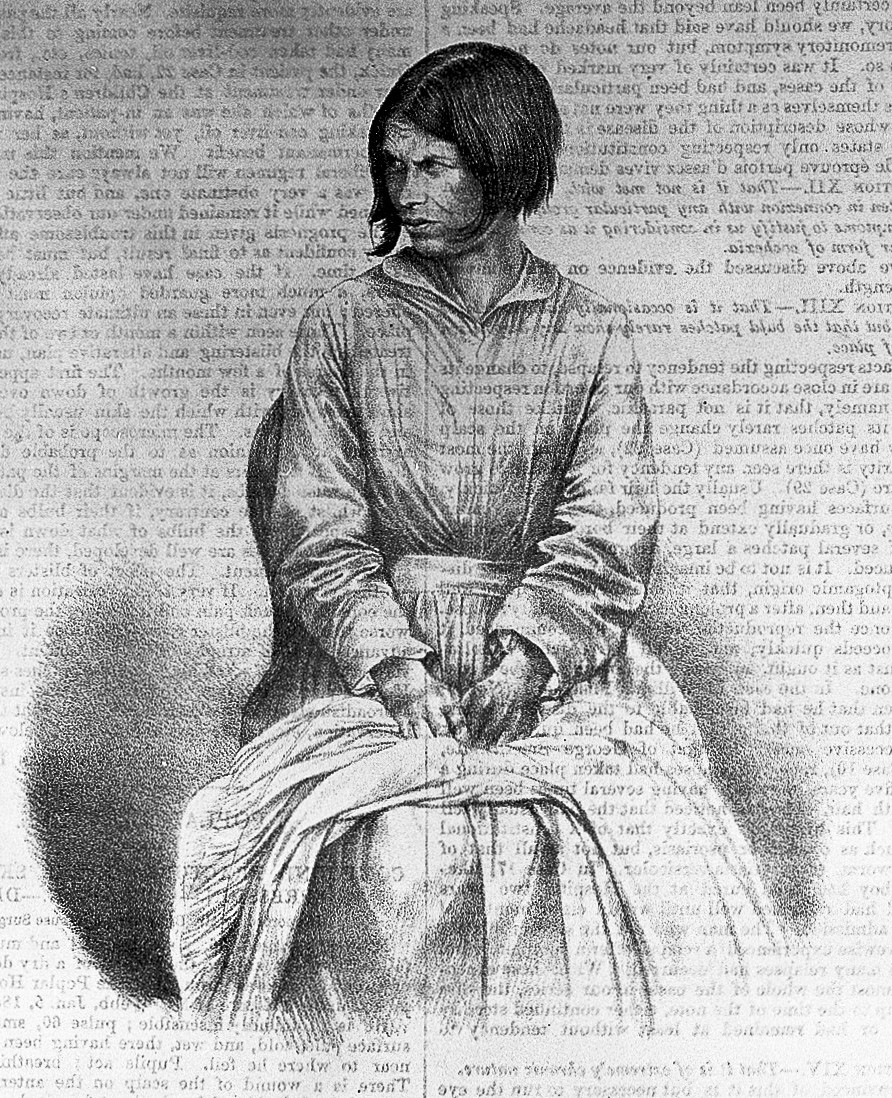
An 1858 lithograph captioned "Melancholy passing into mania"

Hypomania is the milder form of mania, defined as at least four days of the same criteria as mania, but does not cause a significant decrease in the individual's ability to socialize or work, lacks psychotic features, and does not require psychiatric hospitalization. Overall functioning may increase during episodes of hypomania and is thought to serve as a defense mechanism against depression by some. Hypomanic episodes rarely progress to full-blown manic episodes. Some people who experience hypomania show increased creativity, while others are irritable or demonstrate poor judgment.

Hypomania may feel good to some individuals who experience it, though most people who experience hypomania state that the stress of the experience is very painful. People with bipolar disorder who experience hypomania tend to forget the effects of their actions on those around them. Even when family and friends recognize mood swings, the individual will often deny that anything is wrong. If not accompanied by depressive episodes, hypomanic episodes are often not deemed problematic unless the mood changes are uncontrollable or volatile. In individuals with bipolar II disorder, depressive symptoms typically overlap with hypomania symptoms. These individuals may not be able to identify these specific symptoms as hypomania, rather they view them as typical depression with slight alterations in mood. Most commonly, symptoms continue for time periods from a few weeks to a few months.

=== Depressive episodes ===
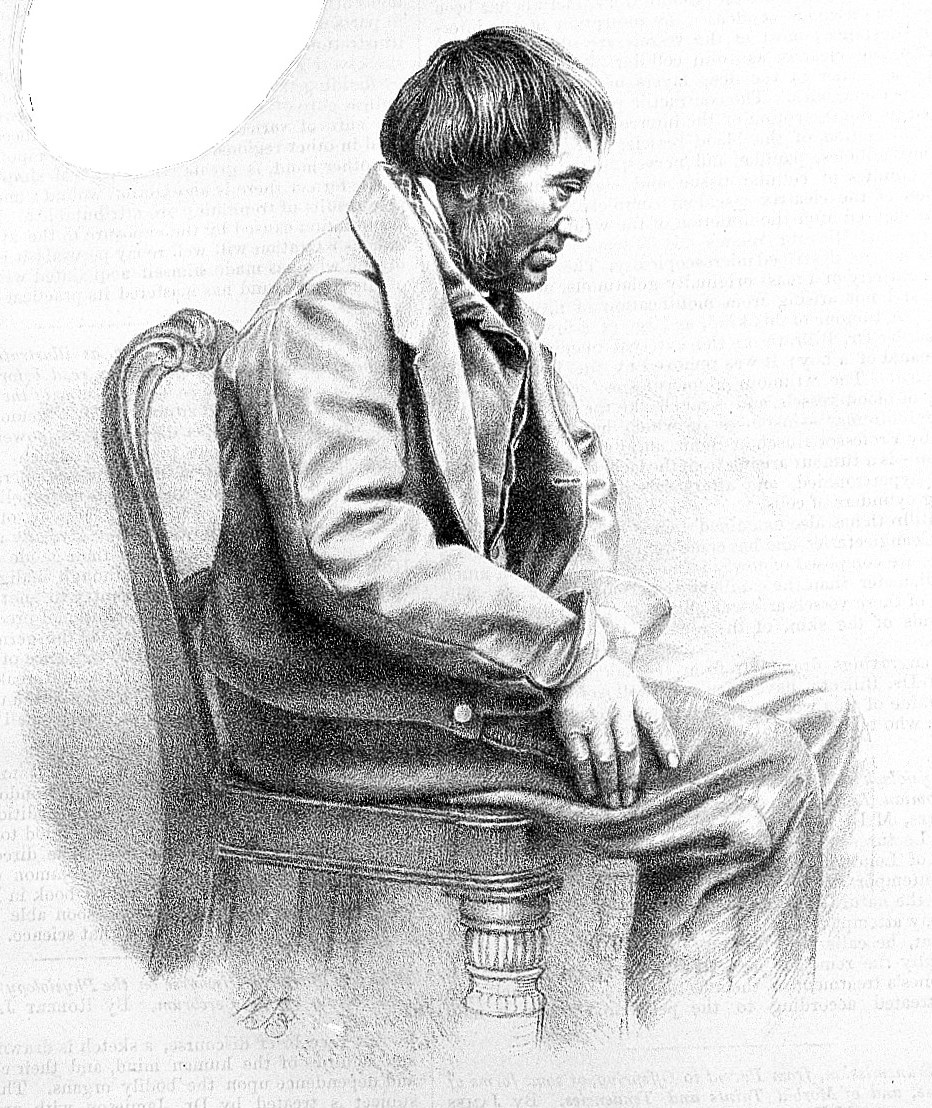
Melancholy by William Bagg, after a photograph by Hugh Welch Diamond

Symptoms of the depressive phase of bipolar disorder include persistent feelings of sadness, irritability or anger, loss of interest in previously enjoyed activities, excessive or inappropriate guilt, hopelessness, sleeping too much or not enough, changes in appetite or weight, fatigue, problems concentrating, self-loathing or feelings of worthlessness, and thoughts of death or suicide. Although the DSM-5 criteria for diagnosing unipolar and bipolar episodes are the same, some clinical features are more common in the latter, including increased sleep, sudden onset and resolution of symptoms, significant weight gain or loss, and severe episodes after childbirth.

The earlier the age of onset, the more likely the first few episodes are to be depressive. For most people with bipolar types 1 and 2, the depressive episodes are much longer than the manic or hypomanic episodes. Since a diagnosis of bipolar disorder requires a manic or hypomanic episode, many affected individuals are initially misdiagnosed as having major depression and treated with prescribed antidepressants.

=== Mixed affective episodes ===
In bipolar disorder, a mixed state is an episode during which symptoms of both mania and depression occur simultaneously. Individuals experiencing a mixed state may have manic symptoms such as grandiose thoughts while simultaneously experiencing depressive symptoms such as excessive guilt or feeling suicidal. They are considered to have a higher risk for suicidal behavior as depressive emotions such as hopelessness are often paired with mood swings or difficulties with impulse control. Anxiety disorders occur more frequently as a comorbidity in mixed bipolar episodes than in non-mixed bipolar depression or mania. Substance (including alcohol) use also follows this trend, thereby appearing to depict bipolar symptoms as no more than a consequence of substance use.

=== Cycling ===
Predictable timing of mood switches is possible though uncommon in bipolar disorder. A systematic review by Geoffroy and others (2014) found seasonal pattern mania in 15% of patients.

== Causes ==
The causes of bipolar disorder likely vary between individuals and the exact mechanism underlying the disorder remains unclear. Genetic influences are believed to account for 73–93% of the risk of developing the disorder indicating a strong hereditary component. The overall heritability of the bipolar spectrum has been estimated at 0.71. Twin studies have been limited by relatively small sample sizes but have indicated a substantial genetic contribution, as well as environmental influence. For bipolar I disorder, the rate at which identical twins (same genes) will both have bipolar I disorder (concordance) is around 40%, compared to about 5% in fraternal twins. A combination of bipolar I, II, and cyclothymia similarly produced rates of 42% and 11% (identical and fraternal twins, respectively). The rates of bipolar II combinations without bipolar I are lower—bipolar II at 23 and 17%, and bipolar II combining with cyclothymia at 33 and 14%—which may reflect relatively higher genetic heterogeneity.

The cause of bipolar disorders overlaps with major depressive disorder. When defining concordance as the co-twins having either bipolar disorder or major depression, then the concordance rate rises to 67% in identical twins and 19% in fraternal twins. The relatively low concordance between fraternal twins brought up together suggests that shared family environmental effects are limited, although the ability to detect them has been limited by small sample sizes.

=== Genetic ===
Behavioral genetic studies have suggested that many chromosomal regions and candidate genes are related to bipolar disorder susceptibility with each gene exerting a mild to moderate effect. The risk of bipolar disorder is nearly ten-fold higher in first-degree relatives of those with bipolar disorder than in the general population; similarly, the risk of major depressive disorder is three times higher in relatives of those with bipolar disorder than in the general population.

Although the first genetic linkage finding for mania was in 1969, linkage studies have been inconsistent. Findings point strongly to heterogeneity, with different genes implicated in different families. Robust and replicable genome-wide significant associations showed several common single-nucleotide polymorphisms (SNPs) are associated with bipolar disorder, including variants within the genes CACNA1C, ODZ4, and NCAN. The largest and most recent genome-wide association study failed to find any locus that exerts a large effect, reinforcing the idea that no single gene is responsible for bipolar disorder in most cases. Polymorphisms in BDNF, DRD4, DAO, and TPH1 have been frequently associated with bipolar disorder and were initially associated in a meta-analysis, but this association disappeared after correction for multiple testing. On the other hand, two polymorphisms in TPH2 were identified as being associated with bipolar disorder.

Due to the inconsistent findings in a genome-wide association study, multiple studies have undertaken the approach of analyzing SNPs in biological pathways. Signaling pathways traditionally associated with bipolar disorder that have been supported by these studies include corticotropin-releasing hormone signaling, cardiac β-adrenergic signaling, phospholipase C signaling, glutamate receptor signaling, cardiac hypertrophy signaling, Wnt signaling, Notch signaling, and endothelin 1 signaling. Of the 16 genes identified in these pathways, three were found to be dysregulated in the dorsolateral prefrontal cortex portion of the brain in post-mortem studies: CACNA1C, GNG2, and ITPR2.

Bipolar disorder is associated with reduced expression of specific DNA repair enzymes and increased levels of oxidative DNA damages. The AKAP11 gene was discovered in 2022 as the first gene linked to bipolar disorder. The exomes of around 14,000 individuals with bipolar disorder were analyzed and compared to those without the condition. The findings were combined with data from another study in the Schizophrenia Exome Sequencing Meta-Analysis (SCHEMA), examining the genome sequences of 24,000 people alongside the original 14,000 bipolar disorder cases. This study identified genetic variants, including the AKAP11 gene, associated with an increased risk of bipolar disorder. The AKAP11 gene's interaction with the GSK3B protein, a molecular target of lithium, points to a possible mechanism behind the medication's therapeutic effects.

=== Environmental ===
Psychosocial factors play a significant role in the development and course of bipolar disorder, and individual psychosocial variables may interact with genetic dispositions. Recent life events and interpersonal relationships likely contribute to the onset and recurrence of bipolar mood episodes, just as they do for unipolar depression. In surveys, 30–50% of adults diagnosed with bipolar disorder report traumatic/abusive experiences in childhood, which is associated with earlier onset, a higher rate of suicide attempts, and more co-occurring disorders such as post-traumatic stress disorder. Subtypes of abuse, such as sexual and emotional abuse, also contribute to violent behaviors seen in patients with bipolar disorder. The number of reported stressful events in childhood is higher in those with an adult diagnosis of bipolar spectrum disorder than in those without, particularly events stemming from a harsh environment rather than from the child's own behavior. Acutely, mania can be induced by sleep deprivation in around 30% of people with bipolar disorder.

=== Gene-environment interaction ===
According to the "kindling" hypothesis, when people who are genetically predisposed toward bipolar disorder experience stressful events, the stress threshold at which mood changes occur becomes progressively lower, until the episodes eventually start (and recur) spontaneously. There is evidence supporting an association between early-life stress (such as childhood trauma) and dysfunction of the hypothalamic-pituitary-adrenal axis leading to its overactivation, which may play a role in the pathogenesis of bipolar disorder.

=== Neurological ===
Less commonly, bipolar disorder or a bipolar-like disorder may occur as a result of or in association with a neurological condition or injury including stroke, traumatic brain injury, HIV infection, multiple sclerosis, porphyria, and rarely temporal lobe epilepsy.

== Mechanisms ==
=== Psychosocial hypotheses ===
==== Childhood trauma ====
According to Quide and others (2020), childhood trauma is associated with "earlier onset and greater severity of bipolar disorder (BD) in adulthood". A systematic review and meta-analysis by Murri and others (2016) found that cortisol levels are "associated with the manic phase of BD" and that "HPA axis dysregulation is not an endophenotype of BD, but seems related to environmental risk factors, such as childhood trauma".

==== Stigmatization ====
According to Latifian and others (2023),

Stigma has considerable consequences for people living with bipolar disorders and their families and causes them to suffer from severe psychological distress in addition to the pain and agony inflicted by the disease.

From Table 5 of the same systematic review, examples of 'severe psychological distress' include lower self-esteem, 'social deprivation', and lower quality of life.

=== Biological hypotheses ===
The biological mechanism responsible for switching from a manic or hypomanic episode to a depressive episode, or vice versa, "remains poorly understood".

==== Vigilance regulation ====
Hegerl and Hensch (2014) proposed a "common pathophysiology" between ADHD and bipolar disorder composed of a three-part cycle:

1. "Unstable vigilance regulation", as measured by electroencephalography (EEG).
2. Efforts at "Vigilance stabilization", such as "hyperactivity, sensation seeking".
3. "Sleep deficits", which have already been found to be associated with mania.

Further development of this hypothesis was undertaken by Strauß and others, including Hegerl (March 2018).

==== Dopamine ====
A review by Ashok and others (2017) proposed that mania is caused by "elevations in D2/3 receptor availability and a hyperactive reward processing network", though they conceded that their model "[relies] on pharmacological evidence".

Wu and others (2024) proposed that 'sleep loss' underlies changes in dopaminergic activity and subsequent mood change. Alloy and others (2015) proposed a similar model.

==== Neuroimmunology ====
Barbosa and others (2014) note the elevated rate of autoimmune diseases and other immunological aberrations in bipolar disorder. They propose that pro-inflammatory cytokines alter "neural processes" such as neurogenesis and memory, causing neurodegeneration.

Rosenblat and McIntyre (2017) propose a "bidirectional relationship between BD and immune dysfunction," with a variety of possible mechanisms connecting cytokine levels to mood changes. They conjecture that immune dysfunction is relevant to some but not all bipolar disorder patients.

== Diagnosis ==
Bipolar disorder is commonly diagnosed during adolescence or early adulthood, but onset can occur throughout life. Its diagnosis is based on the self-reported experiences of the individual, abnormal behavior reported by family members, friends or co-workers, observable signs of illness as assessed by a clinician, and ideally a medical work-up to rule out other causes. Caregiver-scored rating scales, specifically from the mother, have shown to be more accurate than teacher and youth-scored reports in identifying youths with bipolar disorder. Assessment is usually done on an outpatient basis; admission to an inpatient facility is considered if there is a risk to oneself or others.

The most widely used criteria for diagnosing bipolar disorder are from the American Psychiatric Association's (APA) Diagnostic and Statistical Manual of Mental Disorders, Fifth Edition (DSM-5) and the World Health Organization's (WHO) International Statistical Classification of Diseases and Related Health Problems, 10th Edition (ICD-10). The ICD-10 criteria are used more often in clinical settings outside of the U.S. while the DSM criteria are used within the U.S. and are the prevailing criteria used internationally in research studies. The DSM-5, published in 2013, includes further and more accurate specifiers compared to its predecessor, the DSM-IV-TR. This work has influenced the eleventh revision of the ICD (ICD-11), which includes the various diagnoses within the bipolar spectrum of the DSM-5.

Several rating scales for the screening and evaluation of bipolar disorder exist, including the Bipolar Spectrum Diagnostic Scale, Mood Disorder Questionnaire, the General Behavior Inventory and the Hypomania Checklist. The use of evaluation scales cannot substitute for a full clinical interview, but they serve to systematize the recollection of symptoms. On the other hand, instruments for screening bipolar disorder tend to have lower sensitivity.

=== Differential diagnosis ===
Mental disorders that can mimic bipolar disorder include schizophrenia, major depressive disorder, attention deficit hyperactivity disorder (ADHD), post-traumatic stress disorder (PTSD), and certain personality disorders, such as borderline personality disorder. A key difference between bipolar disorder and borderline personality disorder is the nature of the mood swings; in contrast to the sustained changes to mood over days to weeks or longer seen in bipolar disorder, those experienced in borderline personality disorder (more accurately called emotional dysregulation) are sudden and often short-lived, and secondary to social stressors.

Although there are no biological tests that are diagnostic of bipolar disorder, blood tests and/or imaging are carried out to investigate whether medical illnesses with clinical presentations similar to that of bipolar disorder are present before making a definitive diagnosis. Neurologic diseases such as multiple sclerosis, complex partial seizures, strokes, brain tumors, Wilson's disease, traumatic brain injury, Huntington's disease, and complex migraines can mimic features of bipolar disorder. An EEG may be used to exclude neurological disorders such as epilepsy, and a CT scan or MRI of the head may be used to exclude brain lesions. Additionally, disorders of the endocrine system such as hypothyroidism, hyperthyroidism, and Cushing's disease are in the differential as is the connective tissue disease systemic lupus erythematosus. Infectious causes of mania that may appear similar to bipolar mania include herpes encephalitis, HIV, influenza, or neurosyphilis. Certain vitamin deficiencies such as pellagra (niacin deficiency), vitamin B_{12} deficiency, folate deficiency, and Wernicke–Korsakoff syndrome (thiamine deficiency) can also lead to mania. Common medications that can cause manic symptoms include antidepressants, prednisone, Parkinson's disease medications, thyroid hormone, stimulants (including cocaine and methamphetamine), and certain antibiotics.

=== Bipolar spectrum ===
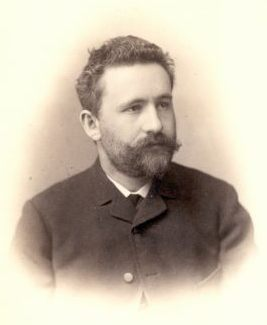
Since Emil Kraepelin's distinction between bipolar disorder and schizophrenia in the 19th century, researchers have defined a spectrum of different types of bipolar disorder.

Bipolar spectrum disorders include bipolar I disorder, bipolar II disorder, cyclothymic disorder, and cases where subthreshold symptoms are found to cause clinically significant impairment or distress. These disorders involve major depressive episodes that alternate with manic or hypomanic episodes, or with mixed episodes that feature symptoms of both mood states. The concept of the bipolar spectrum is similar to that of Emil Kraepelin's original concept of manic depressive illness. Bipolar II disorder was established as a diagnosis in 1994 within DSM IV; though debate continues over whether it is a distinct entity, part of a spectrum, or is the very same condition as bipolar I disorder.

=== Criteria and subtypes ===
Simplified graphical comparison of bipolar I, bipolar II and cyclothymia

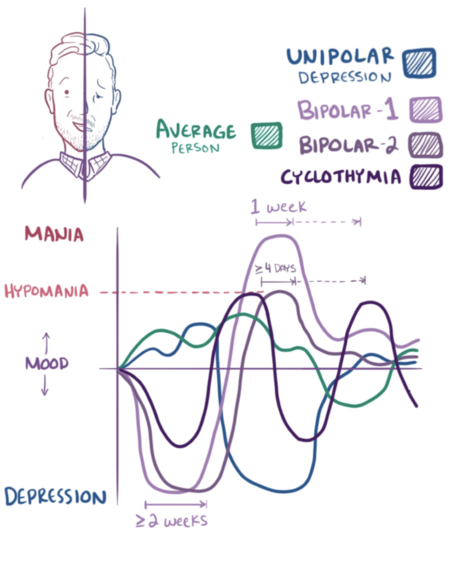
More detailed graphical comparison of

The DSM and the ICD characterize bipolar disorder as a spectrum of disorders occurring on a continuum. The DSM-5 and ICD-11 lists three specific subtypes:

- Bipolar I disorder: At least one manic episode is necessary to make the diagnosis; depressive episodes are common in the vast majority of cases with bipolar disorder I, but are unnecessary for the diagnosis. Specifiers such as "mild, moderate, moderate-severe, severe" and "with psychotic features" should be added as applicable to indicate the presentation and course of the disorder.
- Bipolar II disorder: No manic episodes and one or more hypomanic episodes and one or more major depressive episodes. Hypomanic episodes do not go to the full extremes of mania (i.e., do not usually cause severe social or occupational impairment, and are without psychosis), and this can make bipolar II more difficult to diagnose, since the hypomanic episodes may simply appear as periods of successful high productivity and are reported less frequently than a distressing, crippling depression.
- Cyclothymia: A history of hypomanic symptoms; with periods of depression that do not meet criteria for major depressive episodes. In cyclothymia, sub-threshold hypomanic and depressive symptoms alternate for at least two years in adults and at least one year in children and adolescents.

When relevant, specifiers for peripartum onset and with rapid cycling should be used with any subtype. Individuals who have subthreshold symptoms that cause clinically significant distress or impairment, but do not meet full criteria for one of the three subtypes may be diagnosed with other specified or unspecified bipolar disorder. Other specified bipolar disorder is used when a clinician chooses to explain why the full criteria were not met (e.g., hypomania without a prior major depressive episode). If the condition is thought to have a non-psychiatric medical cause, the diagnosis of bipolar and related disorder due to another medical condition is made, while substance/medication-induced bipolar and related disorder is used if a medication is thought to have triggered the condition.

While hyperthymic temperament is not considered a pathological disorder, it is genetically associated with bipolar I and may predispose affected individuals to a manic-depressive episode. Hyperthymic temperament has been described as subsyndromal manifestation within the broader bipolar spectrum.

==== Rapid cycling ====
Most people who meet criteria for bipolar disorder experience a number of episodes, on average 0.4 to 0.7 per year, lasting three to six months. Rapid cycling, however, is a course specifier that may be applied to any bipolar subtype. It is defined as having four or more mood disturbance episodes within a one-year span. Rapid cycling is usually temporary but is common amongst people with bipolar disorder and affects 25.8–45.3% of them at some point in their life. These episodes are separated from each other by a remission (partial or full) for at least two months or a switch in mood polarity (i.e., from a depressive episode to a manic episode or vice versa). The definition of rapid cycling most frequently cited in the literature (including the DSM-5 and ICD-11) is that of Dunner and Fieve: at least four major depressive, manic, hypomanic or mixed episodes during a 12-month period.

The literature examining the pharmacological treatment of rapid cycling is sparse and there is no clear consensus with respect to its optimal pharmacological management. "Ultra rapid" and "ultradian" have been applied to faster-cycling types of bipolar disorder. People with the rapid cycling or faster-cycling subtypes of bipolar disorder tend to be more difficult to treat and less responsive to medications than other people with bipolar disorder. There is evidence that rapid cycling may be iatrogenic and caused by antidepressant use. In contrast, atypical antipsychotics and mood stabilizers do not worsen rapid cycling.

=== Coexisting psychiatric conditions ===
The diagnosis of bipolar disorder can be complicated by coexisting (comorbid) psychiatric conditions including obsessive–compulsive disorder, substance-use disorder, eating disorders, attention deficit hyperactivity disorder, autism spectrum disorder, social phobia, premenstrual syndrome (including premenstrual dysphoric disorder), or panic disorder. A thorough longitudinal analysis of symptoms and episodes, assisted if possible by discussions with friends and family members, is crucial to establishing a treatment plan where these comorbidities exist. Children of parents with bipolar disorder more frequently have other mental health problems.

== Prevention ==
Attempts at prevention of bipolar disorder have focused on stress (such as childhood adversity or highly conflictual families) which, although not a diagnostically specific causal agent for bipolar, does place genetically and biologically vulnerable individuals at risk for a more severe course of illness. Longitudinal studies have indicated that full-blown manic stages are often preceded by a variety of prodromal clinical features, providing support for the occurrence of an at-risk state of the disorder when an early intervention might prevent its further development and/or improve its outcome. Circadian rhythm disruptions such as traveling across many time zones (jet lag) can destabilize bipolar disorder and lead to manic or psychotic episodes.

== Management ==
The aim of management is to treat acute episodes safely with medication and work with the patient in long-term maintenance to prevent further episodes and optimise function using a combination of pharmacological and psychotherapeutic techniques. Involuntary hospitalization and institutionalization were once acceptable practice, but new recommendations to advance human rights instead call for the abolition of institutionalization and forced treatment. In lieu of a hospital admission, support services available can include drop-in centers, visits from members of a community mental health team or an Assertive Community Treatment team, supported employment, patient-led support groups, and intensive outpatient programs. These are sometimes referred to as partial-inpatient programs. Compared to the general population, people with bipolar disorder are less likely to frequently engage in physical exercise. Exercise may have physical and mental benefits for people with bipolar disorder, but there is a lack of research.

=== Psychosocial ===
Psychotherapy aims to assist a person with bipolar disorder in accepting and understanding their diagnosis, coping with various types of stress, improving their interpersonal relationships, and recognizing prodromal symptoms before full-blown recurrence. Cognitive behavioral therapy (CBT), family-focused therapy, psychoeducation, as well as interpersonal and social rhythm therapy appear to be effective. Further, recent research indicates that mindfulness and mindfulness-based therapies show considerable potential to alleviate depression and anxiety as well as to improve mood regulation and executive control in bipolar patients. Most studies have been based only on bipolar I, however, and treatment during the acute phase can be a particular challenge. Some clinicians emphasize the need to talk with individuals experiencing mania, to develop a therapeutic alliance in support of recovery.

=== Medication ===
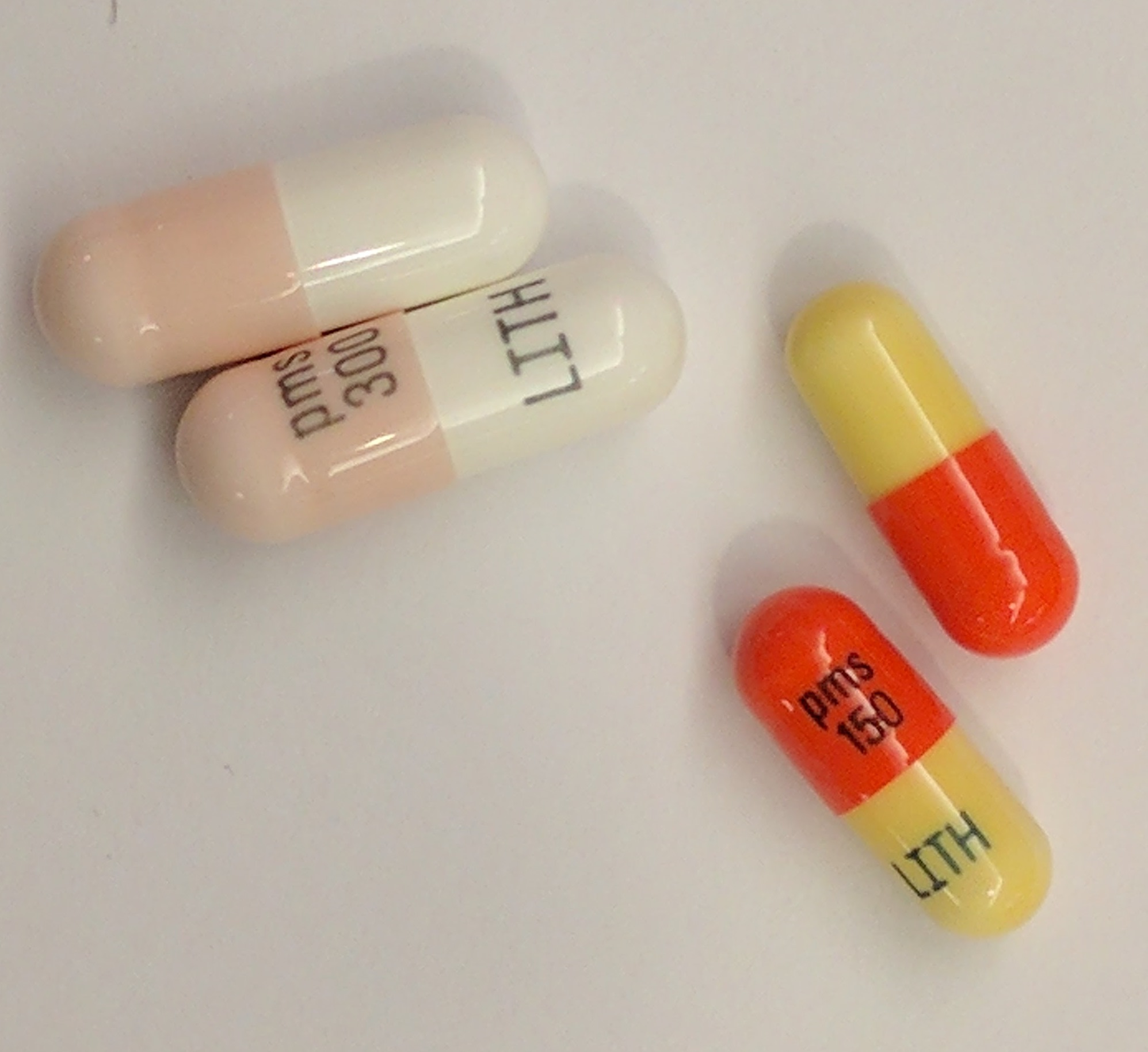
Lithium is often used to treat bipolar disorder and has the best evidence for reducing suicide.

Medications are often prescribed to help improve symptoms of bipolar disorder. Medications approved for treating bipolar disorder including mood stabilizers and atypical antipsychotics. Sometimes a combination of medications may also be suggested. The choice of medications may differ depending on the bipolar disorder episode type or if the person is experiencing unipolar or bipolar depression. Other factors to consider when deciding on an appropriate treatment approach includes if the person has any comorbidities, their response to previous therapies, adverse effects, and the desire of the person to be treated.

==== Mood stabilizers ====
Lithium and the anticonvulsants carbamazepine, lamotrigine, and valproic acid are classed as mood stabilizers due to their effect on the mood states in bipolar disorder.

- Lithium has the best overall evidence and is considered an effective treatment for acute manic episodes, preventing relapses, and bipolar depression. Lithium reduces the risk of suicide, self-harm, and death in people with bipolar disorder. Lithium is preferred for long-term mood stabilization. Lithium treatment is also associated with adverse effects and it has been shown to erode kidney and thyroid function over extended periods.
- Valproate has become a commonly prescribed treatment and effectively treats manic episodes.
- Carbamazepine is less effective in preventing relapse than lithium or valproate. Carbamazepine effectively treats manic episodes, with some evidence it has greater benefit in rapid-cycling bipolar disorder, or those with more psychotic symptoms or more symptoms similar to that of schizoaffective disorder.
- Lamotrigine has some efficacy in treating depression, and this benefit is greatest in more severe depression. Lamotrigine may have a similar effectiveness to lithium for treating bipolar disorder, however, there is evidence to suggest that lamotrigine is less effective at preventing recurrent mania episodes. Lamotrigine treatment has been shown to be safer compared to lithium treatment, with less adverse effects.

Valproate and carbamazepine are teratogenic and should be avoided as a treatment in women of childbearing age, but discontinuation of these medications during pregnancy is associated with a high risk of relapse. Lithium is also teratogenic in the first trimester, though it can be acceptable during this period after careful weighing of benefits and risks.

The effectiveness of topiramate is unknown. Mood stabilizers are used for long-term maintenance but have not demonstrated the ability to quickly treat acute bipolar depression. However, several atypical antipsychotics are FDA approved to treat bipolar depression.

==== Antipsychotics ====
Antipsychotic medications are effective for short-term treatment of bipolar manic episodes and appear to be superior to lithium and anticonvulsants for this purpose. Multiple atypical antipsychotics are FDA approved to treat bipolar depression: lurasidone, quetiapine, olanzapine-fluoxetine combination, cariprazine, and lumateperone are all FDA approved for depression in bipolar disorder. Atypical antipsychotics such as lurasidone and clozapine are also indicated for bipolar depression refractory to treatment with mood stabilizers. Olanzapine is effective in preventing relapses, although the supporting evidence is weaker than the evidence for lithium. A 2006 review found that haloperidol was an effective treatment for acute mania, limited data supported no difference in overall efficacy between haloperidol, olanzapine or risperidone, and that it could be less effective than aripiprazole.

==== Antidepressants ====
Antidepressant monotherapy is not recommended in the treatment of bipolar disorder and does not provide any benefit over mood stabilizers. Atypical antipsychotic medications are preferred over antidepressants to augment the effects of mood stabilizers due to the lack of efficacy of antidepressants in bipolar disorder. The FDA has approved 5 atypical antipsychotic medications to specifically treat bipolar depression. Treatment of bipolar disorder using antidepressants may carry a risk of affective switches where a person switches from depression to manic or hypomanic phases or mixed states.

There may also be a risk of accelerating cycling between phases when antidepressants are used in bipolar disorder, known as rapid cycling. The risk of affective switches is higher in bipolar I depression; antidepressants are generally avoided in bipolar I disorder or only used with mood stabilizers when they are deemed necessary. Whether modern antidepressants cause mania or rapid cycling in bipolar disorder is highly controversial, as is whether antidepressants provide any benefit over mood stabilizers alone. Selective serotonin reuptake inhibitors and bupropion still have a risk of rapid cycling and manic switch, but it is lower than other types of antidepressants. Serotonin-norepinephrine reuptake inhibitors, such as venlafaxine and duloxetine, tetracyclic antidepressants such as mirtazapine, and tricyclic antidepressants have higher rates of manic switch and rapid cycling.

==== Combined treatment approaches ====
Atypical antipsychotics and mood stabilizers used together are quicker and more effective at treating mania than either class of drug used alone. According to the International Society for Bipolar Disorders (ISBD) and Canadian Network for Mood and Anxiety Treatments (CANMAT) guidelines, a first-line combination treatment for bipolar depression is the atypical antipsychotic lurasidone plus the mood stabilizers lithium or valproate.

==== Other drugs ====
Short courses of benzodiazepines are used in addition to other medications for calming effect until mood stabilizing become effective. Electroconvulsive therapy (ECT) is an effective form of treatment for acute mood disturbances in those with bipolar disorder, especially when psychotic or catatonic features are displayed. ECT is also recommended for use in pregnant women with bipolar disorder. A single intravenous dose of ketamine may produce a rapid but transient antidepressant effect in bipolar depression, although the evidence is of low to very low certainty, and evidence for other glutamate receptor modulators or for sustained remission and safety remains inconclusive. Gabapentin and pregabalin are not proven to be effective for treating bipolar disorder.

=== Children ===
Treating bipolar disorder in children involves medication and psychotherapy. The literature and research on the effects of psychosocial therapy on bipolar spectrum disorders are scarce, making it difficult to determine the efficacy of various therapies. Mood stabilizers and atypical antipsychotics are commonly prescribed. Among the former, lithium is the only compound approved by the FDA for children. Psychological treatment combines normally education on the disease, group therapy, and cognitive behavioral therapy. Long-term medication is often needed.

=== Resistance to treatment ===
The poor response from some bipolar patients to treatment has given evidence to the concept of treatment-resistant bipolar disorder. Guidelines to the definition of treatment-resistant bipolar disorder and evidence-based options for its management were reviewed in 2020.

=== Management of obesity ===
A large proportion (approximately 68%) of people who seek treatment for bipolar disorder are obese or overweight and managing obesity is important for reducing the risk of other health conditions that are associated with obesity. Management approaches include non-pharmacological, pharmacological, and surgical. Examples of non-pharmacological include dietary interventions, exercise, behavioral therapies, or combined approaches. Pharmacological approaches include weight-loss medications or changing medications already being prescribed. Some people with bipolar disorder who have obesity may also be eligible for bariatric surgery. The effectiveness of these various approaches to improving or managing obesity in people with bipolar disorder is not clear.

== Prognosis ==
A lifelong condition with periods of partial or full recovery in between recurrent episodes of relapse, bipolar disorder is considered to be a major health problem worldwide because of the increased rates of disability and premature mortality. It is also associated with co-occurring psychiatric and medical problems, higher rates of death from natural causes (e.g., cardiovascular disease), and high rates of initial under- or misdiagnosis, causing a delay in appropriate treatment and contributing to poorer prognoses. When compared to the general population, people with bipolar disorder also have higher rates of other serious medical comorbidities including diabetes mellitus, respiratory diseases, HIV, and hepatitis C virus infection. After a diagnosis is made, it remains difficult to achieve complete remission of all symptoms with the currently available psychiatric medications and symptoms often become progressively more severe over time.

Compliance with medications is one of the most significant factors that can decrease the rate and severity of relapse and have a positive impact on overall prognosis. However, the types of medications used in treating BD commonly cause side effects and more than 75% of individuals with BD inconsistently take their medications for various reasons. Of the various types of the disorder, rapid cycling (four or more episodes in one year) is associated with the worst prognosis due to higher rates of self-harm and suicide. Individuals diagnosed with bipolar who have a family history of bipolar disorder are at a greater risk for more frequent manic/hypomanic episodes. Early onset and psychotic features are also associated with worse outcomes, as well as subtypes that are nonresponsive to lithium.

Early recognition and intervention also improve prognosis as the symptoms in earlier stages are less severe and more responsive to treatment. Onset after adolescence is connected to better prognoses for both genders, and being male is a protective factor against higher levels of depression. For women, better social functioning before developing bipolar disorder and being a parent are protective towards suicide attempts.

=== Functioning ===
Changes in cognitive processes and abilities are seen in mood disorders, with those of bipolar disorder being greater than those in major depressive disorder. These include reduced attentional and executive capabilities and impaired memory. People with bipolar disorder often experience a decline in cognitive functioning during (or possibly before) their first episode, after which a certain degree of cognitive dysfunction typically becomes permanent, with more severe impairment during acute phases and moderate impairment during periods of remission. As a result, two-thirds of people with BD continue to experience impaired psychosocial functioning in between episodes even when their mood symptoms are in full remission. A similar pattern is seen in both BD-I and BD-II, but people with BD-II experience a lesser degree of impairment. People with bipolar disorder have higher relative odds for dementia (by a factor of 2.96) and lithium reduces the relative odds of dementia by 49%. Maintenance treatment with lithium reduces rates of dementia to that of the general population.

When bipolar disorder occurs in children, it severely and adversely affects their psychosocial development. Children and adolescents with bipolar disorder have higher rates of significant difficulties with substance use disorders, psychosis, academic difficulties, behavioral problems, social difficulties, and legal problems. Cognitive deficits typically increase over the course of the illness. Higher degrees of impairment correlate with the number of previous manic episodes and hospitalizations, and with the presence of psychotic symptoms. Early intervention can slow the progression of cognitive impairment, while treatment at later stages can help reduce distress and negative consequences related to cognitive dysfunction.

Despite the overly ambitious goals that are frequently part of manic episodes, symptoms of mania undermine the ability to achieve these goals and often interfere with an individual's social and occupational functioning. One-third of people with BD remain unemployed for one year following a hospitalization for mania. Depressive symptoms during and between episodes, which occur much more frequently for most people than hypomanic or manic symptoms over the course of illness, are associated with lower functional recovery in between episodes, including unemployment or underemployment for both BD-I and BD-II. However, the course of illness (duration, age of onset, number of hospitalizations, and the presence or not of rapid cycling) and cognitive performance are the best predictors of employment outcomes in individuals with bipolar disorder, followed by symptoms of depression and years of education.

Stigmatization by others is "associated with greater functional impairment, anxiety and poorer work-related outcomes"; vice versa, self-stigmatization is associated with "lower levels of functioning across a range of domains and greater depressive and anxiety symptoms".

=== Recovery and recurrence ===
A naturalistic study in 2003 by Tohen and coworkers from the first admission for mania or mixed episode (representing the hospitalized and therefore most severe cases) found that 50% achieved syndromal recovery (no longer meeting criteria for the diagnosis) within six weeks and 98% within two years. Within two years, 72% achieved symptomatic recovery (no symptoms at all) and 43% achieved functional recovery (regaining of prior occupational and residential status). However, 40% went on to experience a new episode of mania or depression within 2 years of syndromal recovery, and 19% switched phases without recovery.

Symptoms preceding a relapse (prodromal), especially those related to mania, can be reliably identified by people with bipolar disorder. There have been intents to teach patients coping strategies when noticing such symptoms with encouraging results.

=== Suicide ===
Bipolar disorder can cause suicidal ideation that leads to suicide attempts. Individuals whose bipolar disorder begins with a depressive or mixed affective episode seem to have a poorer prognosis and an increased risk of suicide. One out of two people with bipolar disorder attempt suicide at least once during their lifetime and many attempts are successfully completed. The annual average suicide rate is 0.4–1.4%, which is 30 to 60 times greater than that of the general population. The number of deaths from suicide in bipolar disorder is between 18 and 25 times higher than would be expected in similarly aged people without bipolar disorder. The lifetime risk of suicide is much higher in those with bipolar disorder, with an estimated 34% of people attempting suicide and 15–20% dying by suicide.

Risk factors for suicide attempts and death from suicide in people with bipolar disorder include older age, prior suicide attempts, a depressive or mixed index episode (first episode), a manic index episode with psychotic symptoms, hopelessness or psychomotor agitation present during the episodes, co-existing anxiety disorder, a first degree relative with a mood disorder or suicide, interpersonal conflicts, occupational problems, bereavement or social isolation.

Lithium has been shown to reduce the risk of suicide in people with bipolar disorder or major depression to close to the same level as that of the general population. Randomized controlled trials and other studies for over 40 years have shown that lithium is highly effective in reducing suicide among people with bipolar disorder. In addition to reducing suicide, lithium also decreases all-cause mortality in people with bipolar disorder.

== Epidemiology ==
Burden of bipolar disorder around the world: disability-adjusted life years per 100,000 inhabitants in 2004 <180 180–185 185–190 190–195 195–200 200–205 205–210 210–215 215–220 220–225 225–230 >230

Bipolar disorder is the sixth leading cause of disability worldwide and has a lifetime prevalence of about 1 to 3% in the general population. However, a reanalysis of data from the National Epidemiological Catchment Area survey in the United States suggested that 0.8% of the population experience a manic episode at least once (the diagnostic threshold for bipolar I) and a further 0.5% have a hypomanic episode (the diagnostic threshold for bipolar II or cyclothymia). Including sub-threshold diagnostic criteria, such as one or two symptoms over a short time-period, an additional 5.1% of the population, adding up to a total of 6.4%, were classified as having a bipolar spectrum disorder. A more recent analysis of data from a second US National Comorbidity Survey found that 1% met lifetime prevalence criteria for bipolar I, 1.1% for bipolar II, and 2.4% for subthreshold symptoms. Estimates vary about how many children and young adults have bipolar disorder. These estimates range from 0.6 to 15% depending on differing settings, methods, and referral settings, raising suspicions of overdiagnosis. One meta-analysis of bipolar disorder in young people worldwide estimated that about 1.8% of people between the ages of seven and 21 have bipolar disorder. Similar to adults, bipolar disorder in children and adolescents is thought to occur at a similar frequency in boys and girls.

There are conceptual and methodological limitations and variations in the findings. Prevalence studies of bipolar disorder are typically carried out by lay interviewers who follow fully structured/fixed interview schemes; responses to single items from such interviews may have limited validity. In addition, diagnoses (and therefore estimates of prevalence) vary depending on whether a categorical or spectrum approach is used. This consideration has led to concerns about the potential for both underdiagnosis and overdiagnosis.

The incidence of bipolar disorder is similar in men and women as well as across different cultures and ethnic groups. A 2000 study by the World Health Organization found that prevalence and incidence of bipolar disorder are very similar across the world. Age-standardized prevalence per 100,000 ranged from 421.0 in South Asia to 481.7 in Africa and Europe for men and from 450.3 in Africa and Europe to 491.6 in Oceania for women. However, severity may differ widely across the globe. Disability-adjusted life year rates, for example, appear to be higher in developing countries, where medical coverage may be poorer and medication less available. Within the United States, Asian Americans have significantly lower rates than their African American and European American counterparts. In 2017, the Global Burden of Disease Study estimated there were 4.5 million new cases and a total of 45.5 million cases globally.

=== Comorbid conditions ===
People with bipolar disorder often have other co-existing psychiatric conditions such as anxiety (present in about 71% of people with bipolar disorder), substance abuse (56%), personality disorders (36%), attention deficit hyperactivity disorder (10–20%) which can add to the burden of illness and worsen the prognosis. Meta-analytic studies vary in their estimates of the prevalence of bipolar disorder in autism spectrum disorder (3–6% versus 5-10%). Certain medical conditions are also more common in people with bipolar disorder as compared to the general population. This includes metabolic syndrome (present in 37% of people with bipolar disorder), migraine headaches (35%), obesity (21%) and type 2 diabetes (14%). This contributes to a risk of death that is two times higher in those with bipolar disorder as compared to the general population. Hypothyroidism is also common regardless of drug choice.

Substance use disorder is a common comorbidity in bipolar disorder; the subject has been widely reviewed.

== Socioeconomic challenges ==
=== Victimization by criminals ===
According to Teplin and others (2005), people with severe mental illness experience four times more incidences of violent crime compared to the "general population". According to a systematic review and meta-analysis by Kaul and others (2024), people accessing psychiatric services are at greater risk of "sexual violence victimization" than "the general population". For context, interpersonal violence accounted for 1180 Disability Adjusted Life Years (DALYs) per 100,000 people in the Americas in 2021 (ranking 5th compared to all conditions).

Vice versa, a corrected meta-analysis by Verdolini and others (2020) found that rates of violent criminal behavior were not statistically significantly different between people with bipolar disorder and people with substance use disorders. A meta-analysis by Hunt and others (2016) found that 33% of people with Bipolar Disorder have a co-occurring substance use disorder. Likewise, a continuing education article by the American Psychological Association emphasizes,

[...] the strong role that contextual factors such as poverty, neighborhood, and substance use play in violence perpetration by people with serious mental illness, as well as those without mental illness.

=== Homelessness and housing instability ===
==== Prevalence of bipolar disorder ====
Studies have shown that bipolar disorder occurs at significantly higher rates among people experiencing homelessness compared with the general population. A 2024 meta-analysis and systematic review estimates that there is a global prevalence of approximately 8% of bipolar disorder amongst homeless individuals, which is several times higher than the population averages. Earlier reviews also found elevated rates as high as 6–9%, but estimates vary depending on diagnostic criteria and design. Researchers have noted substantial heterogeneity in reported prevalence estimates, which may reflect methodological differences between studies, including variations in the definition of homelessness, diagnostic methods, and sample characteristics.

==== Risk factors ====
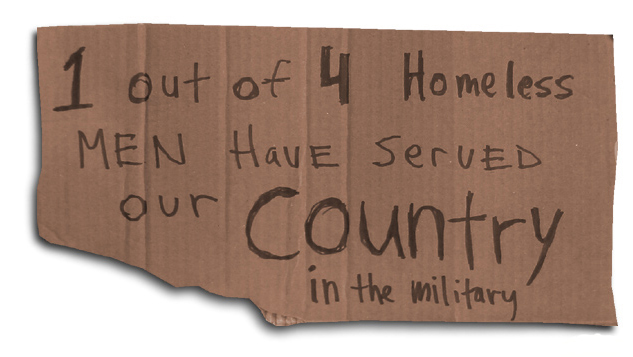
Sign made by homeless veteran

Bipolar disorder is associated with several risk factors for homelessness, including incarceration, substance use, and socioeconomic instability. In the United States, it was reported that in veterans with bipolar disorder, 55% reported being homeless at some point in their lives, and 12% had been homeless within the last four weeks. Homelessness was also highly associated with prior incarceration and co-occurring substance use, which highlights the cyclical relationship between social instability and mental illness.

Additionally, individuals with bipolar disorder who are experiencing homelessness often have an early onset of illness, more frequent manic or depressive episodes, and poor adherence to medication. This can increase the likelihood of relapse and the loss of housing. Veterans and individuals who have been to correctional or psychiatric settings are especially at risk. This highlights that the lack of post-discharge support contributes to the chronic cycles of instability.

Social determinants like poverty, unemployment, and stigma also increase vulnerability to both bipolar disorder and homelessness. Once you are homeless, factors like stress, sleep deprivation, and exposure to unsafe environments are very prevalent and can worsen mood symptoms, making lasting recovery and reintegration even more difficult.

==== Access to care ====
People who are experiencing homelessness face significant barriers to consistent and quality mental health treatment. A study of over 10,000 patients with serious mental illness in the public health system found that homeless patients were less likely to have insurance, the ability to maintain continuous care, and more likely to rely on emergency services in comparison to housed individuals. Disruptions in care contribute to poor participation in treatment plans, higher rates of psychiatric hospitalization, and worsened long-term outcomes. Individuals with bipolar disorder require consistent medication management and therapeutic monitoring, but unstable living conditions make meeting these needs quite difficult. Unable to refill medications, attend appointments, or engage in therapy.

==== Limitations ====
The research on the prevalence of bipolar disorder in the homeless population is limited by the varying definitions of homelessness and challenges in keeping up with individuals on the move. and the variations in diagnostic methods across studies. As a result of this, current estimates of the prevalence of bipolar disorder in the homeless population may be underestimated. Expanding integrated models of care that combine psychiatric treatment with housing and social services has been suggested as a potential approach to improving long-term stability and reducing emergency service use.

== History ==
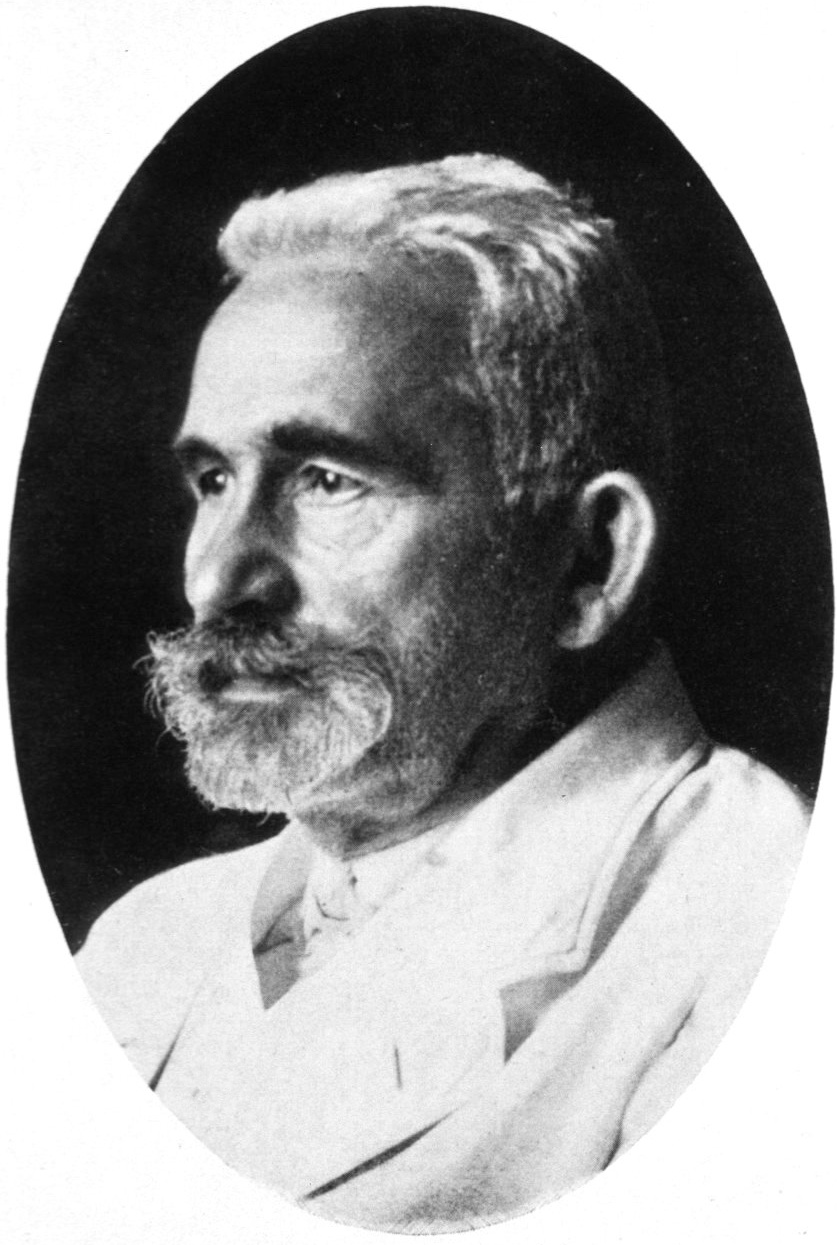
German psychiatrist Emil Kraepelin first distinguished between manic–depressive illness and "dementia praecox" (now known as schizophrenia) in the late 19th century.

In the early 1800s, French psychiatrist Jean-Étienne Dominique Esquirol's lypemania, one of his affective monomanias, was the first elaboration on what was to become modern depression. The basis of the current conceptualization of bipolar illness can be traced back to the 1850s. In 1850, Jean-Pierre Falret described "circular insanity" (la folie circulaire, French pronunciation: [la fɔli siʁ.ky.lɛʁ]); the lecture was summarized in 1851 in the Gazette des hôpitaux ("Hospital Gazette"). Three years later, in 1854, Jules-Gabriel-François Baillarger (1809–1890) described to the French Imperial Académie Nationale de Médecine a biphasic mental illness causing recurrent oscillations between mania and melancholia, which he termed la folie à double forme (French pronunciation: [la fɔli a dubl fɔʀm], "madness in double form"). Baillarger's original paper, "De la folie à double forme", appeared in the medical journal Annales médico-psychologiques (Medico-psychological annals) in 1854.

These concepts were developed by the German psychiatrist Emil Kraepelin (1856–1926), who, using Kahlbaum's concept of cyclothymia, categorized and studied the natural course of untreated bipolar patients. He coined the term manic depressive psychosis, after noting that periods of acute illness, manic or depressive, were generally punctuated by relatively symptom-free intervals where the patient was able to function normally.

The term "manic–depressive reaction" appeared in the first version of the DSM in 1952, influenced by the legacy of Adolf Meyer. Subtyping into "unipolar" depressive disorders and bipolar disorders has its origin in Karl Kleist's concept – since 1911 – of unipolar and bipolar affective disorders, which was used by Karl Leonhard in 1957 to differentiate between unipolar and bipolar disorder in depression. These subtypes have been regarded as separate conditions since publication of the DSM-III. The subtypes bipolar II and rapid cycling have been included since the DSM-IV, based on work from the 1970s by David Dunner, Elliot Gershon, Frederick Goodwin, Ronald Fieve, and Joseph Fleiss.

== Society and culture ==
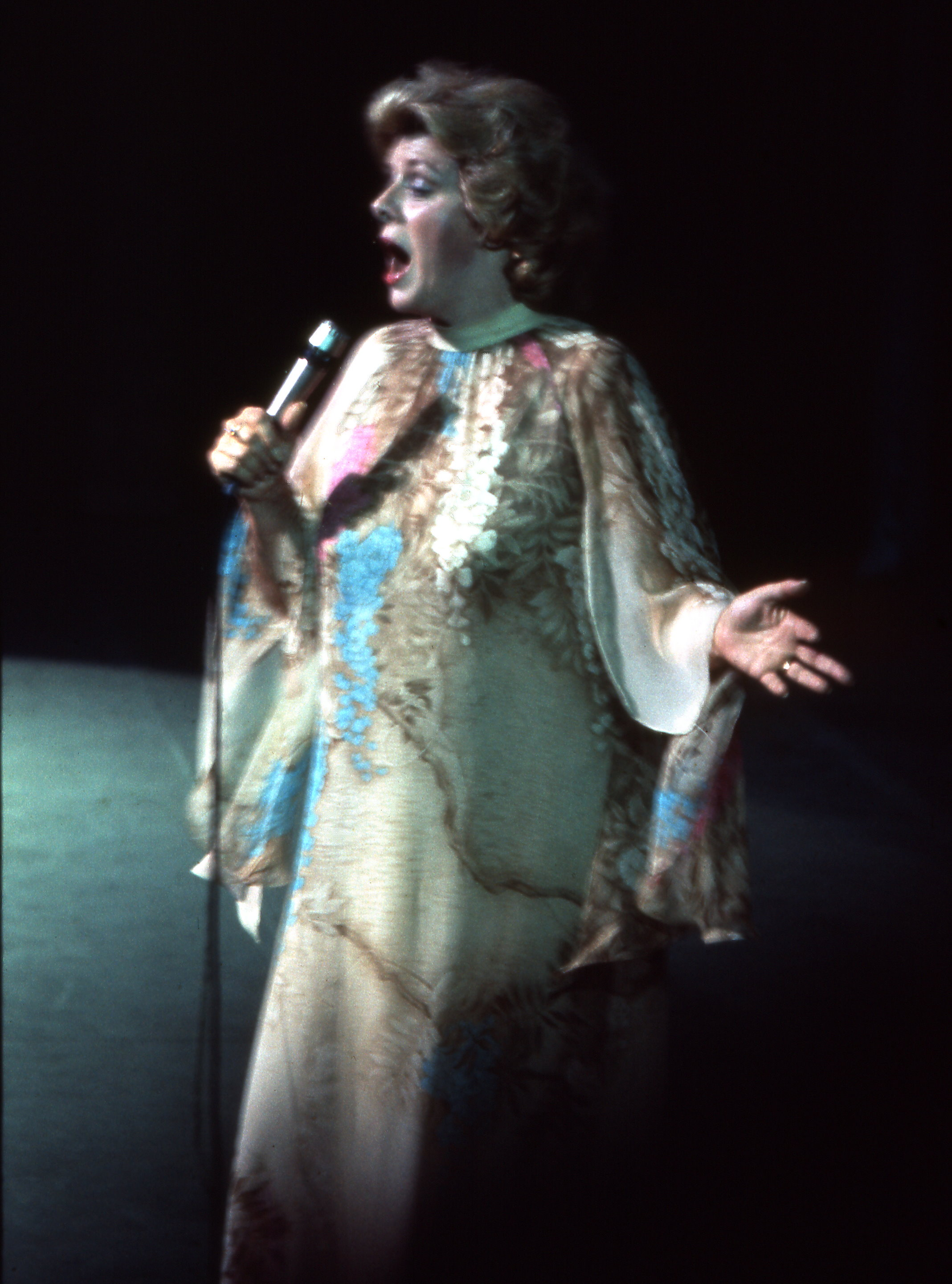
Singer Rosemary Clooney's public revelation of bipolar disorder made her an early celebrity spokesperson for mental illness.

=== Cost ===
The United States spent approximately $202.1 billion on people diagnosed with bipolar I disorder (excluding other subtypes of bipolar disorder and undiagnosed people) in 2015. One analysis estimated that the United Kingdom spent approximately £5.2 billion on the disorder in 2007. In addition to the economic costs, bipolar disorder is a leading cause of disability and lost productivity worldwide. People with bipolar disorder are generally more disabled, have a lower level of functioning, longer duration of illness, and increased rates of work absenteeism and decreased productivity when compared to people experiencing other mental health disorders. The decrease in the productivity seen in those who care for people with bipolar disorder also significantly contributes to these costs.

=== Advocacy ===
There are widespread issues with social stigma, stereotypes, and prejudice against individuals with a diagnosis of bipolar disorder. In 2000, actress Carrie Fisher went public with her bipolar disorder diagnosis. She became one of the most well-recognized advocates for people with bipolar disorder in the public eye and fiercely advocated to eliminate the stigma surrounding mental illnesses, including bipolar disorder. Stephen Fried, who has written extensively on the topic, noted that Fisher helped to draw attention to the disorder's chronicity, relapsing nature, and that bipolar disorder relapses do not indicate a lack of discipline or moral shortcomings. Since being diagnosed at age 37, actor Stephen Fry has pushed to raise awareness of the condition, with his 2006 documentary Stephen Fry: The Secret Life of the Manic Depressive. In an effort to ease the social stigma associated with bipolar disorder, the orchestra conductor Ronald Braunstein cofounded the ME/2 Orchestra with his wife Caroline Whiddon in 2011. Braunstein was diagnosed with bipolar disorder in 1985 and his concerts with the ME/2 Orchestra were conceived in order to create a welcoming performance environment for his musical colleagues, while also raising public awareness about mental illness.

==== Advocacy organizations ====
A variety of advocacy organizations exist to support people living with bipolar disorder, the people who care for them, and those researching the illness.

- The International Society for Bipolar Disorders (ISBD) is a research and educational organization focused on bipolar disorder. The ISBD offers resources for mental health professionals, patients and their families. It publishes the journal Bipolar Disorders.
- The International Bipolar Foundation (IBPF) provides education and resources for those living with bipolar disorder.
- CREST.BD is a Canadian network focused on bipolar disorder. The CREST.BD network includes researchers, mental health professionals and people with bipolar disorder.
- Canadian Network for Mood and Anxiety Treatments (CANMAT) publishes treatment guidelines for bipolar disorder together with the International Society for Bipolar Disorders (ISBD).

==== World Bipolar Day ====
World Bipolar Day is on March 30, the birthday of Vincent Van Gogh. The goal of the day is to eliminate stigma about bipolar disorder. It is sponsored by the International Society for Bipolar Disorders, the International Bipolar Foundation, and the Asian Network of Bipolar Disorder (ANBD).

In spite of World Bipolar Day's co-occurrence with Van Gogh's birthday, scholars have variously suggested that Vincent Van Gogh "was a manic-depressive", that he had temporal lobe epilepsy, or had acute intermittent porphyria.

=== Support groups ===
The Depression and Bipolar Support Alliance (DBSA), formerly the National Depressive and Manic Depressive Association, is patient-run support and advocacy organization with approximately 200 chapters and 700 support groups mostly in the United States. Attendance at a DBSA support group has been associated with increased functioning and well-being among participants.

Bipolar UK, formerly the Manic Depression Fellowship, is a patient-led mental health support and advocacy organization in the United Kingdom. It runs 85 support groups for people living with bipolar disorder in the UK.

=== Notable cases ===
Numerous authors have written about bipolar disorder and many successful people have openly discussed their experience with it. Kay Redfield Jamison, a clinical psychologist and professor of psychiatry at the Johns Hopkins University School of Medicine, profiled her own bipolar disorder in her memoir An Unquiet Mind (1995). It is likely that Grigory Potemkin, Russian statesman and alleged husband of Catherine the Great, suffered from some kind of bipolar disorder. Several celebrities have also publicly shared that they have bipolar disorder; in addition to Carrie Fisher and Stephen Fry these include Catherine Zeta-Jones, Mariah Carey, Kanye West, Jane Pauley, Demi Lovato, Selena Gomez, and Russell Brand.

John Adams, president of the United States 1787–1801, probably suffered from bipolar II, although the condition had not been named at the time. Adams exhibited periods of intense activity, temper, and "mania" alternating with times of deep depression and withdrawal, such as a documented five-day period of severe, low-energy withdrawal while in the Netherlands. Benjamin Franklin noted that Adams "is always an honest man, often a wise one, but sometimes and in some things, absolutely out of his senses."

=== Media portrayals ===
Several dramatic works have portrayed characters with traits suggestive of the diagnosis which have been the subject of discussion by psychiatrists and film experts alike.

In Mr. Jones (1993), the titular character (Richard Gere) swings from a manic episode into a depressive phase and back again, spending time in a psychiatric hospital and displaying many of the features of the syndrome. In The Mosquito Coast (1986), Allie Fox (Harrison Ford) displays some features including recklessness, grandiosity, increased goal-directed activity and mood lability, as well as some paranoia. Psychiatrists have suggested that Willy Loman, the main character in Arthur Miller's classic play Death of a Salesman, has bipolar disorder.

The 2009 drama 90210 featured a character, Silver, who was diagnosed with bipolar disorder. Characters Jean Slater and Stacey Slater from the BBC soap EastEnders have been diagnosed with the disorder. Stacey's storyline was developed as part of the BBC's Headroom campaign. The Channel 4 soap Brookside had earlier featured a story about bipolar disorder when the character Jimmy Corkhill was diagnosed with the condition. 2011 Showtime's political thriller drama Homeland protagonist Carrie Mathison has bipolar disorder, which she has kept secret since her school days. The 2014 ABC medical drama, Black Box, featured a world-renowned neuroscientist with bipolar disorder. In the TV series Dave, the eponymous main character, played by Lil Dicky as a fictionalized version of himself, is an aspiring rapper. Lil Dicky's real-life hype man GaTa also plays himself. In one episode, after being off his medication and having an episode, GaTa tearfully confesses to having bipolar disorder. GaTa has bipolar disorder in real life but, like his character in the show, he is able to manage it with medication.

Since 2024, Nicola Coughlan, has co-starred alongside Lydia West, in the British Channel 4 dark television comedy-drama Big Mood. Coughlan portrays the leading role of Maggie who was diagnosed with bipolar disorder. In a series about two best friends navigating friendship amidst a mental health crisis.

=== Creativity ===
A link between mental illness and professional success or creativity has been suggested, including in accounts by Socrates, Seneca the Younger, and Cesare Lombroso. Despite prominence in popular culture, the link between creativity and bipolar has not been rigorously studied. This area of study also is likely affected by confirmation bias. Some evidence suggests that some heritable component of bipolar disorder overlaps with heritable components of creativity. Probands of people with bipolar disorder are more likely to be professionally successful, as well as to demonstrate temperamental traits similar to bipolar disorder. Furthermore, while studies of the frequency of bipolar disorder in creative population samples have been conflicting, full-blown bipolar disorder in creative samples is rare.

== Special populations ==
=== Children ===
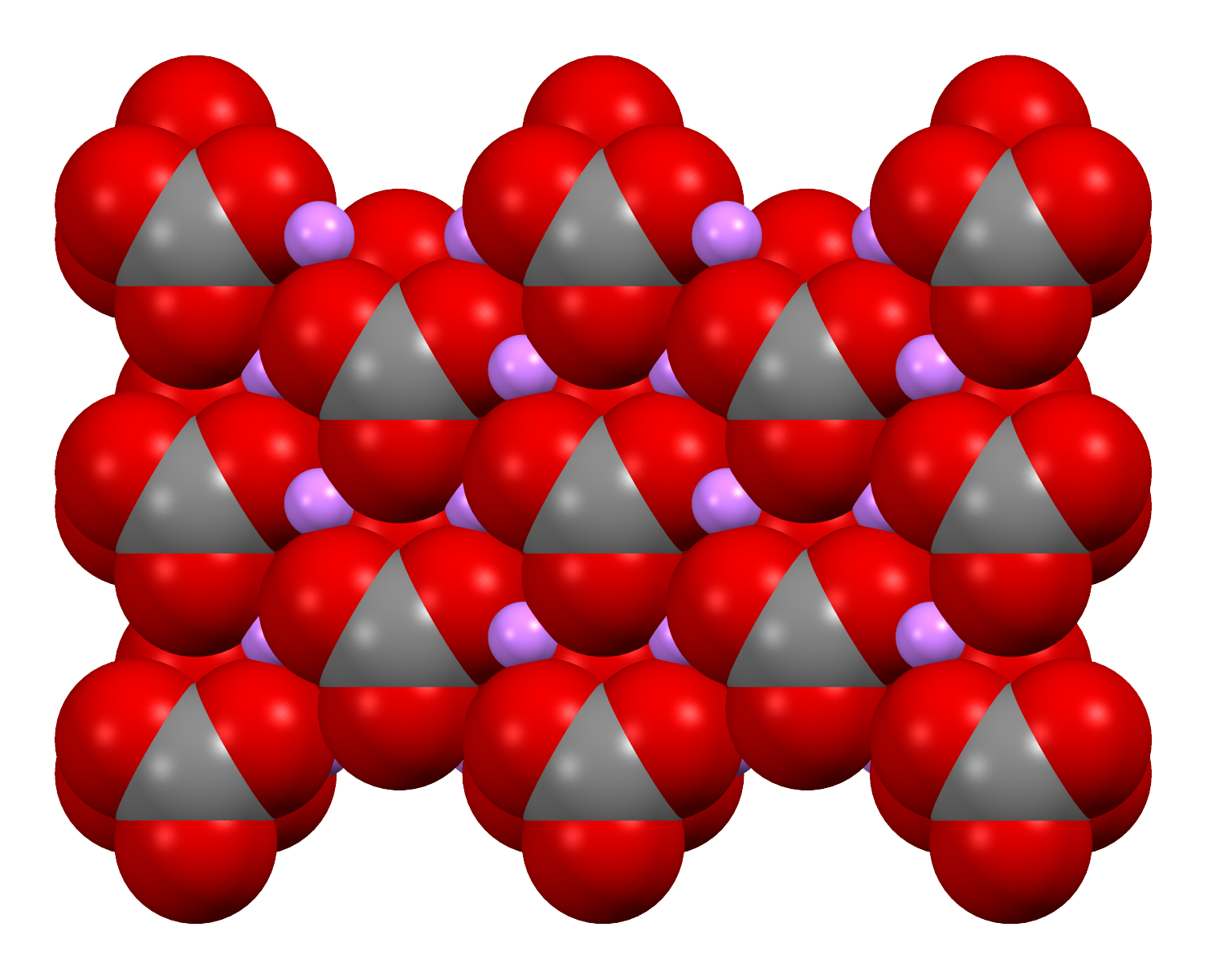
Lithium is the only medication approved by the FDA for treating mania in children.

In the 1920s, Kraepelin noted that manic episodes are rare before puberty. In general, bipolar disorder in children was not recognized in the first half of the twentieth century. This issue diminished with an increased following of the DSM criteria in the last part of the twentieth century. The diagnosis of childhood bipolar disorder, while formerly controversial, has gained greater acceptance among childhood and adolescent psychiatrists. American children and adolescents diagnosed with bipolar disorder in community hospitals increased 4-fold reaching rates of up to 40% in 10 years around the beginning of the 21st century, while in outpatient clinics it doubled reaching 6%. Studies using DSM criteria show that up to 1% of youth may have bipolar disorder. The DSM-5 has established a diagnosis—disruptive mood dysregulation disorder—that covers children with long-term, persistent irritability that had at times been misdiagnosed as having bipolar disorder, distinct from irritability in bipolar disorder that is restricted to discrete mood episodes.

=== Adults ===
Bipolar, on average, starts during adulthood. Bipolar 1, on average, starts at the age of 18 years old, and Bipolar 2 starts at age 22 years old on average. However, most delay seeking treatment for an average of 8 years after symptoms start. Bipolar is often misdiagnosed with other psychiatric disorders. There is no definitive association between race, ethnicity, or socioeconomic status (SES). Adults with Bipolar report having a lower quality of life, even outside of a manic or depressive episode. Bipolar can put strain on marriage and other relationships, having a job, and everyday functioning. Bipolar is associated with higher rates of unemployment. Most have trouble keeping a job, which can lead to trouble with accessing healthcare, resulting in a further decline in their mental health due to not receiving treatment such as medicine and therapy.

=== Elderly ===
Bipolar disorder is uncommon in older patients, with a measured lifetime prevalence of 1% in over 60s and a 12-month prevalence of 0.1–0.5% in people over 65. Despite this, it is overrepresented in psychiatric admissions, making up 4–8% of inpatient admission to aged care psychiatry units, and the incidence of mood disorders is increasing overall with the aging population. Depressive episodes more commonly present with sleep disturbance, fatigue, hopelessness about the future, slowed thinking, and poor concentration and memory; the last three symptoms are seen in what is known as pseudodementia. Clinical features also differ between those with late-onset bipolar disorder and those who developed it early in life; the former group present with milder manic episodes, more prominent cognitive changes and have a background of worse psychosocial functioning, while the latter present more commonly with mixed affective episodes, and have a stronger family history of illness. Older people with bipolar disorder experience cognitive changes, particularly in executive functions such as abstract thinking and switching cognitive sets, as well as concentrating for long periods and decision-making.

== See also ==
- List of people with bipolar disorder
- Sleep and bipolar disorder
- Outline of bipolar disorder
- Depression and Bipolar Support Alliance

== Cited texts ==
- Brown MR, Basso MR (2004). Focus on Bipolar Disorder Research. Nova Science Publishers. ISBN 978-1-59454-059-2.
- Goodwin FK, Jamison KR (2007). Manic–depressive illness: bipolar disorders and recurrent depression (2nd. ed.). Oxford University Press. ISBN 978-0-19-513579-4. OCLC 70929267.
- Jamison KR (1995). An Unquiet Mind: A Memoir of Moods and Madness. New York: Knopf. ISBN 978-0-330-34651-1.
- Millon T (1996). Disorders of Personality: DSM-IV-TM and Beyond. New York: John Wiley and Sons. ISBN 978-0-471-01186-6.
- Robinson DJ (2003). Reel Psychiatry: Movie Portrayals of Psychiatric Conditions. Port Huron, Michigan: Rapid Psychler Press. ISBN 978-1-894328-07-4.
