= Young Mania Rating Scale =

Human Psychiatric Diagnostic Questionnaire

- Purpose: identify presence of mania

The Young Mania Rating Scale (YMRS), developed and popularised by Robert Young and Vincent E Ziegler, is an eleven-item multiple choice diagnostic questionnaire which psychiatrists use to measure the presence and severity of mania and associated symptoms. The scale was originally developed for use in the evaluation of adult patients with bipolar disorder, but has since been adapted for use in pediatric patients. The scale is widely used by clinicians and researchers in the diagnosis, evaluation, and quantification of manic symptomology. It has become the most widely used outcome measure in clinical trials for bipolar disorders, and it is recognized by many regulatory agencies as an acceptable outcome measure despite its age.

A similar scale was later developed to allow clinicians to interview parents about their children's symptoms, in order to ascertain a better diagnosis of mania in children. This parent version (P-YMRS) can be completed by a parent or a teacher to determine whether a child should receive further evaluation from a psychologist or psychiatrist. Clinical studies have demonstrated the reliability and validity of the parent version of the scale, which has been found to provide "clinically meaningful information about mood disorders in youth." The P-YMRS does succeed in identifying most cases of childhood bipolar disorder, but it has an extremely high false positive rate.

== See also ==
- Child Mania Rating Scale
- Diagnostic classification and rating scales used in psychiatry
