= Depressive =

Depressive may refer to:

- Major depressive disorder
- Dysthymia
- Minor depressive disorder
- Recurrent brief depression
- Depressive personality disorder
- Depression (mood)

== See also ==
- Depression (disambiguation)
