= Depression =

Depression may refer to:

== Mental health ==
- Depression (mood), a state of low mood and aversion to activity
- Mood disorders characterized by depression are commonly referred to as simply depression, including:
  - Major depressive disorder, also known as clinical depression
  - Bipolar disorder, also known as manic depression
  - Dysthymia, also known as persistent depressive disorder
  - Psychotic depression, depressive episode that is accompanied by psychotic symptoms
  - Seasonal affective disorder, also known as seasonal depression
  - Atypical depression, characterized by improved mood in response to positive events
- Long-term depression, reduction of neuronal synapse efficacy

== Economics ==
- Economic depression, a sustained, long-term downturn in economic activity in one or more economies
  - Great Depression, a severe economic depression during the 1930s, commonly referred to as simply the Depression
  - Long Depression, an economic depression during 1873–96, known at the time as the Great Depression

== Biology ==
- Depression (kinesiology), an anatomical term of motion, refers to downward movement, the opposite of elevation
- Depression (physiology), a reduction in a biological variable or the function of an organ
- Central nervous system depression, physiological depression of the central nervous system that can result in loss of consciousness

== Earth science ==
- Depression (geology), a landform sunken or depressed below the surrounding area
- Depression (weather), an area of low atmospheric pressure characterized by rain and unstable weather

== Art ==
- "Depressed" (song), by English singer-songwriter Anne-Marie, 2025
