= RBD (disambiguation) =

RBD is a Mexican pop band formed in 2004.

RBD may also refer to:

== Biology and psychology ==
- Rapid eye movement sleep behavior disorder
- Receptor binding domain, a type of protein domain, in molecular biology
- Recurrent brief depression

== Computing ==
- Rational Business Developer, an IDE from IBM
- RADOS Block Device, a feature of the Ceph (software) storage management system
- Amiga rigid disk block (RDB), the root block of the Amiga disk partitioning structure
- Robot programming by demonstration, programming a robot by performing the desired task

== Transport ==
- Dallas Executive Airport, Texas, United States (IATA:RBD)
- Reichsbahndirektion, a former type of railway divisions in Germany (before the creation of the Deutsche Bundesbahn)

== Other uses ==
- Reliability block diagram, a method for evaluating system reliability, in reliability engineering
- River Basin District, a European Union designation per the Water Framework Directive
- "Refined, bleached, and deodorized", a designation for some processed natural oils, such as palm oil
