= Depressive disorder not otherwise specified =

Mood disorder diagnosis

Depressive disorder not otherwise specified (DD-NOS) is designated by the code 311 in the DSM-IV for depressive disorders that are impairing but do not fit any of the officially specified diagnoses. According to the DSM-IV, DD-NOS encompasses "any depressive disorder that does not meet the criteria for a specific disorder." In the DSM-5, it is called unspecified depressive disorder.

Examples of disorders in this category include those sometimes described as minor depressive disorder and recurrent brief depression.

"Depression" refers to a spectrum of disturbances in mood that vary from mild to severe and from short periods to constant illness. DD-NOS is diagnosed if a patient's symptoms fail to meet the criteria more common depressive disorders such as major depressive disorder or dysthymia. Although DD-NOS shares similar symptoms to dysthymia, dysthymia is classified by a period of at least 2 years of constantly recurring depressed mood, where as DD-NOS is classified by much shorter periods of depressed moods.

For most people with the condition, their life will be significantly affected. DD-NOS can make many aspects of a person's daily life difficult to manage, inhibiting their ability to enjoy the things that used to make them happy. Those with the disorder tend to isolate themselves from their friends and families, lose interest in some activities, and experience behavioural changes and sleeping disorders. Some with the condition also experience suicidal tendencies or suicide attempts. In addition to having these symptoms, a diagnosis of DD-NOS will only be made if the symptoms cause significant distress or impairment in social, occupational, or other important areas of functioning. For the diagnosis to be accurate, a psychiatrist is required to spend extensive time with the patient.

Symptoms of the disorder may arise due to several reasons. These include:

- Distress due to medical conditions
- Environmental effects and situations

However, the effects of drugs or medication or bereavement are not classified under the diagnosis.

A person will not be diagnosed with the condition if they have or have had any of the following: a major depressive episode, manic episode, mixed episode or hypomanic episode.

A diagnosis of the disorder will look like: "Depressive Disorder NOS 311".

== Concerns ==
Accurately assessing for a specific Depressive Disorder diagnosis requires an expenditure of time that is deemed unreasonable for most primary care physicians. For this reason, physicians often use this code as a proxy for a more thorough diagnosis. There is concern that this may lead to a "wastebasket" mindset for certain disorders. In addition reimbursement through Medicare may be lower for certain non specific diagnosis.

== Treatment ==
It is possible for this disorder to progress over time. A patient with the disorder can improve their condition with treatments. There are several types of therapies that may improve their condition, but depending on a patient's experience of the disorder or the cause of the disorder, treatments will vary.

- Psychotherapy including behaviour therapy, Gestalt therapy, Adlerian therapy, psychoanalytic therapy and existential therapy.
- Pharmacotherapy through medications including antidepressants.
