= SBQ =

SBQ can mean or refer to:

- Brazilian Chemical Society (Sociedade Brasileira de Química)
- Ringway Centre (also called SBQ), a Grade B locally listed building in Birmingham, England
- Schoolboy Q, American rapper
- Sibi Airport (IATA: SBQ), an airport located in Sibi, Balochistan, Pakistan
- Sobhaga railway station (station code: SBQ), Pakistan
- Special bar quality, the basic or standard quality for carbon steel bars; see Republic Steel
- Suicide Behaviors Questionnaire-Revised (SBQ-R)
- Sutherland Brothers and Quiver, a touring two-band combination from Britain in the 1970s
