= Diurnal mood variation =

Depression symptom varying during the day

Diurnal mood variation or morning depression is a prominent depression symptom characterized by gradual mood improvement through the day, reaching its peak sometime after twilight. While the main form of diurnal mood variation presents itself as described, a reversed form, with a worsening of mood towards the evening, also exists. While some mood changes are generally experienced by the majority of patients diagnosed with depression, such recurrent mood instability is a consistent predictor of suicidal ideation, and may cause increased mortality. Diurnal mood variation is most strongly associated with melancholic depression, which is also referred to as endogenous or somatic depression. According to the diagnostic criteria outlined in The Diagnostic and Statistical Manual of Mental Disorders (DSM) and The International Classification of Diseases (ICD), diurnal mood variation characterized by worsening symptoms in the early morning is recognized as a hallmark symptom of melancholic features in somatic major depressive disorder.

== Symptoms ==
Patients experiencing diurnal mood variation generally complain about the following symptoms, which gradually improve throughout the day:

- feelings of sadness
- irritability
- trouble getting out of bed
- extreme lack of energy in the morning
- fatigue
- psychomotor slowing
- difficulty performing daily tasks, such as making the bed or dressing up
- delayed cognitive function, often described as fogginess

== Distinction from regular mood change ==
Diurnal mood variation generally does not correspond with important behavioural or environmental stimuli, unlike regular mood changes and depression in general, which can be experienced in irregular waves. According to one study, among individuals with melancholic features, mood variations tended to occur spontaneously in over half of the cases. In contrast, healthy controls predominantly attributed their mood fluctuations to their own activities or external circumstances. Patients also report a preference for performing the majority of their activities at dusk or in the evening, which is consistent with the evening chronotype. People experiencing diurnal mood variation consistently prefer later bed and wake-up times.

== Pathomechanism ==
Although diurnal mood variation is a prevalent pattern observed in various mood disorders, there exists a gap in the literature regarding a comprehensive analysis of its underlying causes; the mechanisms underlying DMV symptoms are not well understood. Diurnal changes in activity patterns align with the characteristics of individuals with an evening chronotype, who experience their peak energy and efficiency towards the later part of the day. The body's biological clock system plays a role in regulating wake-behavior rhythms, which in turn affects a person's chronotype and influences their mood variations. Numerous studies have demonstrated that circadian rhythms have an impact on an individual's psychological well-being, including their susceptibility to psychopathological conditions. In clinical settings, individuals with a late chronotype, commonly known as evening types, have been observed to have a higher likelihood of experiencing depression. This association suggests that being an evening type may contribute to an increased risk of developing depressive symptoms.

Functional neuroimaging plays a crucial role in deepening the understanding of the neural mechanisms involved in major depressive disorder with diurnal mood variation symptoms. The circadian or clock system consists of multiple cellular clocks present in organs and tissues, and it plays a vital role in regulating brain function. Research has indicated that functional changes in the ventral and dorsal emotion neural systems are associated with diurnal mood variation symptoms. The ventral emotion neural system, which encompasses the amygdala, ventral anterior cingulate, orbitofrontal cortex, ventral striatum, and insula, is particularly involved in facilitating the experience of emotions. Previous studies have provided support for the notion that diurnal mood symptoms are linked to functional alterations in these brain regions. In one study, when compared to individuals without depression, patients diagnosed with depression exhibited decreased metabolic activity in the frontal and parietal cortex throughout the day. Interestingly, in depressed patients, improvements in mood during the evening were accompanied by increased metabolic activity in the frontal regions of the brain. These findings suggest a link between mood fluctuations and altered metabolic activity in specific brain areas in individuals with depression.

One study revealed that individuals experiencing sleep deprivation displayed a higher percentage of diurnal mood variation compared to an unaffected control group.
