= Double depression =

Combination of major depressive disorder and persistent depressive disorder

Double depression refers to the co-existence of major depressive disorder (MDD) and persistent depressive disorder (PDD), the latter previously referred to as dysthymia. Research has shown that double depression tends to be more severe than either MDD or PDD alone and that individuals with double depression experience relapse more often than those with either MDD or PDD alone. However, there is some research that indicates few differences exist between double depression, MDD, and PDD; as a result, those researchers conclude that double depression is not a distinct disorder.

The literature that details the pharmaceutical treatment of double depression is sparse. Although there are studies that demonstrate that certain medications, such as selective serotonin reuptake inhibitors (SSRIs), are effective methods of treatment, those studies lack placebo controls; therefore, the studies' conclusions are questionable.

Research has found that, as is the case with other depressive disorders, pharmaceutical and psychotherapeutic treatments combined are more effective than the use of either form of treatment alone. Individuals with double depression tend to experience more functional impairment than those with either MDD or PDD alone. As a result, researchers emphasize the need for unique treatments for double depression to be developed and implemented.

== Presentation ==
Individuals with double depression meet the DSM-5 classification criteria for both MDD and PDD. Goldney and Fisher (2004) determined that, in a sample of 3,010 individuals from southern portions of Australia calculated a prevalence rate of double depression of 2.2%. Jonas et al. (2003) reported a prevalence rate of double depression in the United States of 3.4%—based upon an assessment of 7,667 Americans. The prevalence rate of double depression can be compared to rates of PDD at 6.2%, major depressive episode (MDE) at 8.6%, and major depressive episode with severity (MDE-s) at 7.7%. Keller and Shapiro (1982) found that 26% of patients within a sample of 101 met the criteria for both MDD and PDD; however, the aforementioned sample is much smaller—and much more inclined to inaccuracies—than the samples (3,010 and 7,667) described above. Thus, double depression is less common than other forms of depression, but it is still a form of depression that warrants medical attention in the form of behavioral therapies, pharmaceutical treatments, or both (Miller, Norman, and Keitner, 1999).

The characteristics of those with double depression tend to be more severe in nature than those associated with those who have either MDD or PDD. Levitt, Joffe, and MacDonald (1991) found that those with double depression experience fluctuations in mood at an earlier point in life, a more substantial number of depressive episodes, as well as co-morbid disorders of anxieties more often than their MDD-alone counterparts. Goldney and Fisher (2004) reported that individuals with double depression seek medical attention more often than those with either MDD or PDD alone. Leader and Klein (1996) found that individuals with double depression experience a more substantial level of social impairment, which includes factors such as leisure pursuits and relationship characteristics, than those with either MDD or PDD. Dixon and Thyer (1998) concluded that individuals with double depression experiences recoveries on a more frequent basis than their counterparts who have MDD alone (88% to 69%); however, individuals with double depression experience the most substantial rates of relapse of all of those who suffer from chronic depression. In addition, remission from MDD tends to happen faster than remission from PDD (Dixon & Thyer, 1998).

Miller, Norman, and Dow (1986) reported that individuals with double depression endure a more severe path of illness, but experience few differences with respect to social impairment compared to their MDD-alone counterparts. In addition, McCullough et al. (2000) found that, with the exception that patients with double depression tended to experience of more severe illness, few differences were apparent. Therefore, the conclusions drawn in previous research that are associated with the nature of the clinical presentation of double depression are mixed. Multiple scientists emphasize the need for additional research to determine adequate treatments for those with double depression, as depression is a disease that places a considerable burden upon communities and societies; furthermore, those researchers predict depression will be, in an economic sense, the second-most burdensome disease on societies come 2020.

== Treatment ==
Research on pharmaceutical treatment of double depression is sparse. Certain medications, such as fluoxetine, were found in numerous studies to be effective at reducing symptom severity; however, these studies involved open-label trials, double-blind randomized trials that lacked placebo conditions, and small sample sizes. Thus, placebo-controlled trials are needed in order to determine adequate and unique treatments for double depression. In addition, the considerable burden depression places upon communities and societies (Goldney & Fisher, 2004) emphasizes the need for additional research into the treatment of chronic depression.

Hellerstein et al. (1994) theorized that antidepressant medications could be used to ameliorate both MDD and PDD; a pharmaceutical trial found that fluoxetine facilitated remission in 57.1% of patients after five months of treatment. In addition, Miller, Norman, and Keitner (1999) conducted an intervention in which one cohort received pharmaceutical treatment while another cohort received both pharmaceutical and psychotherapeutic treatment. Their results indicated that those who received the combined intervention were more functional—in a social sense—as well as relieved of their depression than those who received the pharmaceutical intervention alone (Miller, Norman, & Keitner, 1999). However, the researchers found that the effect disappeared at both the 6 and 12-month follow-up assessments.

Vasile et al. (2012) conducted a pharmaceutical trial with 16 patients with double depression (who had comorbid alcohol dependence) who were treated and monitored for six months. Results showed that three antidepressants—venlafaxine, duloxetine, and milnacipran—were associated with substantial improvement; venlafaxine was the most effective of the three antidepressants.

Koran, Aboujaoude, and Gamel (2007) conducted a pharmaceutical trial with 24 adults who received duloxetine over the course of a 12-week period. Results showed that duloxetine was successful in the treatment of both PDD as well as double depression. However, the researchers' trial was an open-label trial; as a result, the researchers called for a double-blind and placebo-controlled trial to be conducted in order to further validate the benefits the medication seems to provide.

In addition, Waslick et al. (1999) used duloxetine to treat 19 children and adolescents with either PDD or double depression; after eight weeks of pharmaceutical treatment, 11 of the patients failed to meet the classification criteria for one of the two disorders, which led to the conclusion that duloxetine was a medication that appeared to provide relief from PDD and double depression in children and adolescents. However, the aforementioned trial (in addition to Koran et al.'s (2007) trial) was an open-label trial, which the authors noted as a limitation.

Hirschfield et al. (1998) conducted a 12-week randomized controlled trial (RCT) that involved the administration of sertraline or imipramine, after which 324 of 623 patients either qualified for remission or experienced a substantive improvement in clinical presentation. In a double-blind, fixed-dose trial that involved the use of either the monoamine oxidase inhibitor (MAOI) moclobemide or the selective serotonin reuptake inhibitor (SSRI) fluoxetine, Duarte, Mikkelsen, and DeliniStula (1996) were able to facilitate a minimum of a 50% score reduction on the Hamilton Depression Rating Scale (HDRS). 71% of cases that involved moclobemide—versus 38% of cases that involved fluoxetine—were determined to achieve the aforementioned desired outcome. As a result, the researchers concluded that both antidepressants were similar in their abilities to treat double depression in an effective fashion. However, the lack of a placebo control undermines the extent to which the results can be applied.

Marin, Kocsis, Frances, and Parides (1994) conducted an eight-week open trial that entailed the administration of desipramine to 42 individuals with double depression and 33 individuals with PDD. The researchers found that 70% of the PDD patients experienced a substantial improvement in clinical presentation; the proportion associated with the double depression-cohort was said to be similar. However, the lack of blindness as well as the lack of a placebo control were noted to be a considerable limitation of the aforementioned research.

Goldney and Bain (2006) found that those who have double depression receive some form of treatment on a more substantial basis than their MDD-alone and PDD-alone counterparts. To elaborate, the authors measured that, in Australia, 41.4% of those evaluated with double depression received treatment three or more times over the course of the previous month, whereas 34.5% of those with MDD alone; 23.2% of those with PDD alone; and 10.3% of those who were not depressed received treatment three or more times over the course of the previous month (Goldney & Bain, 2006). In addition, the researchers concluded that those with double depression acquire a more substantial number of treatment visits per month (a mean of 4.3) when compared to their MDD-alone counterparts (a mean of 3.0); their PDD-alone counterparts (a mean of 2.6); and their non-depressed counterparts (a mean of 1.5).

== Prognosis ==
Although double depression is less prevalent than either MDD or PDD, it is still a form of depression that warrants medical attention in the form of behavioral therapies, pharmaceutical treatments, or both. Miller, Norman, and Keitner (1999) found that the use of both behavioral and pharmaceutical treatments was more effective on a short-term basis in the reduction of depression than the use of pharmaceutical treatments alone.

Klein, Shankman, and Rose (2008) determined that poor maternal-child relationship, histories of sexual abuse, co-morbid disorders of anxieties, and lower educational attainment predicted an increased HAM-D score after a decade; the researchers also determined that those same factors predicted, after a decade, increased functional impairment. In addition, the results showed that the life course of depression did not differ to a substantial extent between individuals with MDD-alone and double depression.

Hirschfield et al. (1998) conducted a 12-week RCT that involved the administration of sertraline or imipramine, in which the most notable predictors of treatment response were educational attainment and relationship status; in addition, the authors noted the apparent influence of intrinsic personal traits. However, Hirschfield et al. noted the limitation of a lack of a placebo control.

Klein, Taylor, Harding, and Dickstein (1988) reported that, via their assessment of clinical, familial, and socio-environmental characteristics of those with chronic depression, at a six-month follow-up, individuals with double depression experienced decreased rates of remission, increased manifestations of clinical depressive phenomena, increased functional impairment, and increased likelihood of the development and onset of a hypomanic episode than their MDD-alone counterparts; as a result, the authors underscore the importance of the creation of a distinct classification of double depression due to its unique episodic path.

== Controversies ==
Previous research on the clinical presentation of double depression tends to be mixed. Numerous studies indicate that the course of double depression tends to be more severe in nature. In addition, numerous studies demonstrate that individuals with double depression seek medical attention to a more substantial extent than those with either MDD or PDD. However, Miller, Norman, and Dow (1986) determined that individuals with MDD or PDD versus individuals with double depression experienced similar levels of social impairment. In addition, McCullough and colleagues found that there were few additional differences overall between the characteristics of those with double depression versus those with either MDD or PDD.

Research on the course of double depression is also mixed. Klein, Taylor, Harding, and Dickstein (1988) found that remission in individuals with double depression is less probable than it is in individuals with either MDD or PDD; the researchers also noted that those with double depression are more prone to the development and onset of a hypomanic episode than those with either MDD or PDD. In addition, Klein, Shankman, and Rose (2008) and Hirschfield et al. (1998) both concluded that educational status predicted treatment outcome.

However, Levitt, Joffe, and MacDonald (1991) demonstrated that the courses of the respective depressive disorders did not differ to a substantial extent. While Klein, Shankman, and Rose (2008) advocate for the creation of a distinct classification of double depression in the future edition(s) of the DSM, Levitt and colleagues (as well as McCullough and colleagues) seem to indicate that, due to the numerous similarities as well as limited differences between double depression and either MDD or PDD, the creation of such a classification would be inappropriate and incorrect. Remick, Sadovnick, Lam, Zis, and Yee (1996) determine that the heritable bases of MDD, PDD, and double depression are similar and that, as a result, the three disorders are unable to be differentiated.

== See also ==
- Endogenous depression
