= Minor depressive disorder =

Mood disorder

Minor depressive disorder, also known as minor depression, is a mood disorder that does not meet the full criteria for major depressive disorder but at least two depressive symptoms are present for a long time. These symptoms can be seen in many different psychiatric and mental disorders, which can lead to more specific diagnoses of an individual's condition. However, some of the situations might not fall under specific categories listed in the Diagnostic and Statistical Manual of Mental Disorders. Minor depressive disorder is an example of one of these nonspecific diagnoses, as it is a disorder classified in the DSM-IV-TR under the category Depressive Disorder Not Otherwise Specified (DD-NOS). The classification of NOS depressive disorders is up for debate. Minor depressive disorder as a term was never an officially accepted term, but was listed in Appendix B of the DSM-IV-TR. This is the only version of the DSM that contains the term, as the prior versions and the most recent edition, DSM-5, do not mention it.

A person is considered to have minor depressive disorder if they experience two to four depressive symptoms, with one of them being either depressed mood or loss of interest or pleasure, during a two-week period. The person must not have experienced the symptoms for two years and there must not have been one specific event that caused the symptoms to arise. Although not all cases of minor depressive disorder are deemed in need of treatment, some cases are treated similarly to major depressive disorder. This treatment includes cognitive behavioral therapy (CBT), anti-depressant medication, and combination therapy. Research supports the notion that minor depressive disorder is an early stage of major depressive disorder, or that it is simply highly predictive of subsequent major depressive disorder.

== Signs and symptoms ==
Minor depressive disorder is very similar to major depressive disorder in the symptoms present. Generally, a person's mood is affected by thoughts and feelings of being sad or down on themself or by a loss of interest in nearly all activities. People can experience ups and downs in their life everyday where an event, action, stress or many other factors can affect their feelings on that day. However, depression occurs when those feelings of sadness persist for longer than a few weeks.

A person is considered to have minor depressive disorder if they experience two to four depressive symptoms during a two-week period. The Diagnostic and Statistical Manual of Mental Disorders lists the major depressive symptoms. Depressed mood most of the day and/or loss of interest or pleasure in normal activities must be experienced by the individual to be considered to have minor depressive disorder. Without either of these two symptoms, the disorder is not classified as minor depressive disorder. Other depressive symptoms include significant weight loss or weight gain without trying to diet (an increase/decrease in appetite can provide clues as well), insomnia or hypersomnia, psychomotor agitation or psychomotor retardation, fatigue or loss of energy, and feelings of worthlessness or excessive guilt.

All of these signs can compound on each other to create the last major symptom group of minor depressive disorder: thoughts of death, suicidal thoughts, plans to commit suicide, or a suicide attempt.

Minor depressive disorder differs from major depressive disorder in the number of symptoms present with five or more symptoms necessary for a diagnosis of major depressive disorder. Both disorders require either depressed mood or loss of interest or pleasure in normal activities to be one of the symptoms and the symptoms need to be present for two weeks or longer. Symptoms also must be present for the majority of the length of a day and present for a majority of the days in the two-week period. Diagnosis can only occur if the symptoms cause "clinically significant distress or impairment". Dysthymia consists of the same depressive symptoms, but its main differentiable feature is its longer-lasting nature as compared to minor depressive disorder. Dysthymia was replaced in the DSM-5 by persistent depressive disorder, which combined dysthymia with chronic major depressive disorder.

== Treatment ==
Treatment of minor depressive disorder has not been studied as extensively as major depressive disorder. Although there are often similarities in the treatments used, there are also differences in what may work better for the treatment of minor depressive disorder. Some third-party payers do not pay to cover treatment for minor depressive disorder.

The leading treatment techniques for minor depressive disorder are the use of antidepressants and therapy. Typically, patients with minor depression were treated by watchful waiting, prescribed antidepressants, and given brief supportive counseling, but Problem-Solving Treatment for Primary Care (PST-PC) is a Cognitive-Behavioral Therapy that has gained popularity. In one study, PST-PC and Paroxetine, an antidepressant, were shown to be equally effective in significantly reducing symptoms. In another study, PST-PC was compared with the more typical care of the time and shown to reduce symptoms more quickly. Although the use of antidepressants has been widely used, not all agree that it is an appropriate treatment for some minor depression disorder settings.

Another alternative that has been researched is the use of St. John's wort (Hypericum perforatum). This herbal treatment has been studied by various groups with various results. Some studies show evidence of the treatment being helpful to treat minor depression, but others show that it does no better than the placebo.

== History ==
At its core, minor depressive disorder is the same illness as major depressive disorder with its symptoms being less pronounced. This ties its history closely to that of major depressive disorder. Depression in the past has largely been shrouded in mystery, as its causes and appropriate treatment were largely unknown. By the 1950s, it was clear that depression could be both a mental and largely physical disease, thus being able to be treated through both psychotherapy and medication. When the DSM-IV-TR was created and major depressive disorder was spelled out more clearly, there still seemed to be an uncategorized range of depression. People in this category did not have a complete set of symptoms in order to be diagnosed with major depression, but still were undoubtedly depressed. The DSM-IV-TR solution to this uncatergorized range of depression was to create Depressive Disorder Not Otherwise Specified (NOS). This group of not specified disorders included minor depressive disorder. In the recent switch to the current DSM-5, minor depressive disorder was dropped from the list of depression disorders.

With the disappearance of minor depressive disorder from the DSM-5, there has been confusion between dysthymic disorder, persistent depressive disorder, and minor depressive disorder. Dysthymic disorder was a subsection in the DSM-IV-TR under mood disorders. In the DSM-5, dysthymia is relabeled as "Persistent Depressive Disorder (Dysthymia)". There are differences between persistent depressive disorder and minor depressive disorder including: length of symptom presence, the number of symptoms present, and recurrent periods. The diagnosis of minor depressive disorder has historically been harder to outline, which could have perhaps lead to the disappearance of the disorder. The DSM-IV-TR includes a statement detailing the difficulty of diagnosis, "symptoms meeting research criteria for minor depressive disorder can be difficult to distinguish from periods of sadness that are an inherent part of everyday life".
