= Depression (physiology) =

Reduction in a particular biological variable or function of an organ

In physiology and medicine, depression refers to a lowering, in particular a reduction in a specific biological variable or the functions of an organ. It is the opposite of elevation. For example, it is possible to refer to "depressed thyroid function" or to a depression of blood flow in a particular area.

Further examples:

- Depression of the central nervous system of an animal may be expressed as drowsiness or sleep, lack of coordination and unconsciousness.
- Respiratory depression or hypoventilation.
