= Recurrent brief depression =

Type of depression

- Other names: Periodic melancholia, intermittent depressive disorder
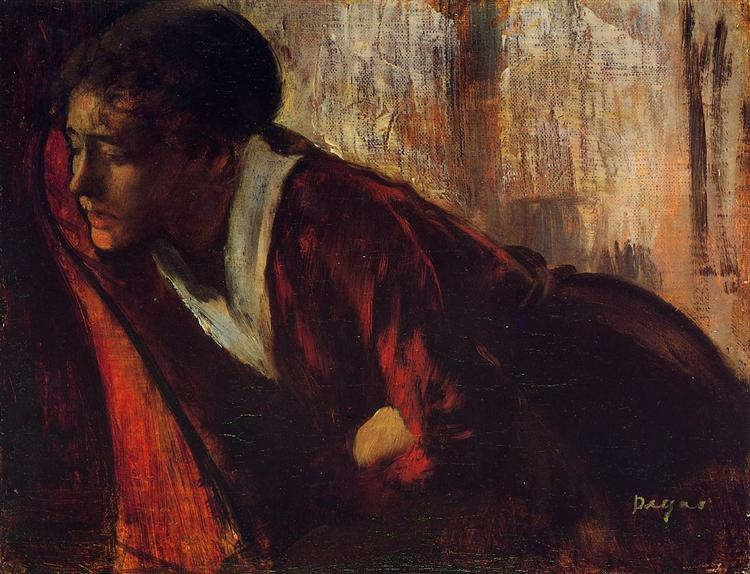
- Melancholy by French artist Edgar Degas (1874)
- Specialty: Psychiatry, clinical psychology
- Symptoms: Low mood, anhedonia, impaired function, suicidal ideation, irritability, anxiety, hypersomnia
- Complications: Hypomania, self-harm, suicide
- Duration: 2–13 days for 6–12 times per year
- Differential diagnosis: Major Depressive Disorder, Dysthymia, Bipolar Disorder, Borderline Personality Disorder
- Treatment: Psychotherapy, psychopharmacology
- Frequency: ~9% (lifetime risk); 5% (12-month risk)

Recurrent brief depression (RBD) is a mental disorder characterized by intermittent depressive episodes, not related to menstrual cycles in women, occurring between approximately 6–12 times per year. These episodes should occur over the course of at least one year or more, fulfilling the diagnostic criteria for major depressive episodes (DSM-IV and ICD-10) except for duration in which RBD is less than 14 days (typically 5–7 days). Despite the short duration of the depressive episodes, such episodes are severe, and suicidal ideation and impaired function are rather common. The majority of patients with RBD also report symptoms of anxiety and increased irritability. Hypersomnia is also rather frequent. RBD may be the only mental disorder present; however, RBD may also occur as part of a history of recurrent major depressive episodes or bipolar disorders. RBD is also seen among some patients with personality disorders.

== Prevalence ==
Due to the lack of studies of RBD, the results for prevalence vary widely. The lifetime prevalence of RBD has been estimated at 16%, and the one-year prevalence at 5%. The World Health Organization project on "Psychological problems in general health care", which was based on primary care samples, reported a one-year prevalence of 3.7 – 9.9%. However, none of these studies differentiate between RBD with and without a history of other mood disorders (e.g. major depression). DSM-IV field trial estimated the lifetime of RBD only to be about 2%.

== Cause ==
The cause of RBD is unknown, but recent findings may suggest a link between RBD and bipolar disorders, pointing to the importance of genetic factors. A small subgroup of patients with RBD have temporal lobe epilepsy.

== Treatment ==
Both psychotherapy as well as different drugs (e.g. serotonin reuptake inhibitors – SSRIs or mood stabilizers, e.g. lithium, antiepileptics) have been suggested as treatments. However, no randomized controlled treatment trial of RBD has been conducted.

== History ==
Disorders characterized by periods with depressive episodes lasting hours to days have been described since 1852 and have been labelled "periodic melancholia", "intermittent depressive disorder" or "brief depression". The third version of the Diagnostic and Statistical Manual of Mental Disorders (DSM-III) from 1980, which relied heavily on findings from studies conducted in psychiatric in- and out-patient settings, required at least 14 days duration for a diagnosis of depression. No diagnostic category was allocated a depressive episode of shorter duration. Thus, intermittent depressive disorder, included in the Research Diagnostic Criteria (1975) was considered to identify minor versions of major depression ("minor depression") and not included in the DSM-III.

However, based on data from epidemiological studies, the Swiss psychiatrist and researcher, Jules Angst, coined the concept "recurrent brief depression" (RBD) and provided diagnostic criteria for this type of mood disorder in 1985. Several other European studies independently confirmed the occurrence of RBD in the general population and clinical samples. RBD was thus included in the 10th classification of mental and behavioral disorders (ICD-10 F38.1) published by the World Health Organization in 1992 (WHO, 1992; WHO, 1993). Less frequent episodes of brief depressions were labelled "infrequent brief depression" and not included in ICD-10. The American classification system of mental disorders, DSM-IV (1994), provided provisional diagnostic criteria for RBD, but decided to await further studies before including RBD in the classification system. As of 2022, Recurrent Brief Depression is listed under "Other Specified Depressive Disorder" in the DSM-5-TR.
