= Moussa B. H. Youdim =

Israeli neuroscientist and pharmacologist

- מוסא ב.ה. יודעים
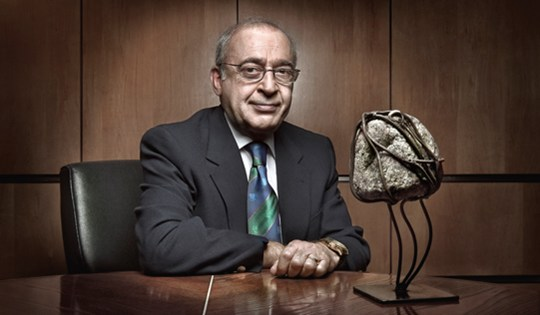
- Moussa B.H. Youdim
- Born: February 28, 1940 (age 86); Tehran, Iran
- Education: McGill University (BSc, MS, PhD)
- Known for: Development of anti-Parkinson drugs (selegiline and rasagiline) H-Index, 147
- Awards: Landau Prize for Brain Research (1986); Anna-Monika Prize for neurobiology of depression (1974); EMET Prize for Brain Sciences (2010); Israel Prize in Life Sciences (2022); The Maimonides Award (2023); The Tel Aviv University Aufzien Center and Israel Parkinson Association Parkinson Prizes (2024); The British Pharmacology Society Sir Henry James Wellcome Gold Medal (2025)
- Scientific career
- Fields: Neuroscience, Neuropharmacology, Drug development, Multi targeted drugs possessing neuroprotective and neurorestorative activities. Alzheimer's disease, Molecular biology, Development of monoamine oxidase B inhibitors as anti Parkinson drugs, Iron dysregulation in brain function, Neurodegenerative diseases
- Workplaces: Technion - Israel Institute of Technology; Youdim Pharmaceuticals
- Doctoral advisor: Theodore Sourkes

Moussa B. H. Youdim (Hebrew: מוסא ב.ה. יודעים, Persian: موسى ب. ح. یودعیم; born, February 28, 1940) is an Israeli neuroscientist specializing in neurochemistry and neuropharmacology. He is the discoverer of both monoamine oxidase (MAO) B inhibitors l-deprenyl (Selegiline) and rasagiline (Azilect) used as anti-Parkinson drugs which possess neuroprotective activities. He is currently professor emeritus at Technion - Faculty of Medicine and President of Youdim Pharmaceuticals. He was awarded the EMET Prize for Brain Sciences in 2010 and the Israel Prize in Life Sciences in 2022.

== Early life ==
Youdim was born on February 28, 1940, in Tehran, Iran, the son of Farangiss Lahijani and Eliahoo Youdim, a businessman. He attended Jewish school in Teheran and in 1952 he left Iran to study in a Jewish school in Brighton, England.

== University education ==
He earned a B.Sc degree in biochemistry in 1972 from McGill University in Montreal. In 1964 he received his masters degree in the laboratory of Professor Theodore Sourkes at McGill University's Biochemistry Department and Psychiatry Department at Allan Memorial Institute. In his master's thesis he studied the effect of heat, inhibitors and riboflavin deficiency on mitochondrial monoamine oxidase in liver and brain and identified two forms of monoamine oxidases. For his doctoral research in the same lab the topic was the purification and characterization of mitochondrial membrane bound monoamine oxidase in the liver and brain, being one of the first to do so receiving his PhD from McGill University in 1966.

His postdoctoral research 1966-1971 was with Prof. Merton Sandler at London University Post Graduate School at Queen Charlotte’s Maternity Hospital, London and continued his research on brain monoamine oxidases. He, Merton Sandler and Edda Hannington of the Wellcome Trust established the defect in metabolism of dietary food stuff such as cheese and chocolate containing tyramine and phenylethylamine in initiating migraine headache in susceptible subjects. They received the Gold Medal of British Migraine Association in 1974. He spent a year in K.F. Tipton’s laboratory, in the department of biochemistry, University of Cambridge. In 1972 he received a Wellcome Trust Travelling Fellowship to be at College de France in Paris in Jaques Glowinski's department.

== Academic career ==
From 1973 to 1977 he was a senior research associate in MRC Unit and department of clinical pharmacology at the faculty of medicine, University of Oxford. At Oxford he pioneered research on the effect of nutritional iron deficiency on cognition and learning in rats and how it affects the brain dopmaine neurotransmission system, confirming learning disabilities observed in children with nutritional iron deficiency. He continued to study the neurophamacology of monoamine oixdase A and B and he also pioneered the first use of monoamine oxidase B inhibitor l-deprenyl (later named selegiline),a failed antidepressant developed by Hungarian drug company, Chinoin, as anti-Parkinson drug with Prof. Peter Reiderer and Walter Birkmeyer.

In 1977 he moved to Israel to establish the Pharmacology Department at the fledgling faculty of medicine of the Technion-Israel Institute of Technology, which was three years old at the time. He was chairman of the department from 1977 until 1994. There he continued the work he had started on the dysregulation of brain iron metabolism, function and behavior. Together with Peter Reiderer they identified accumulation of iron in the dopamine neurons of substantia nigra pars compacta of Parkinsonian brains and role of iron initiated oxidative stress induced neurodegeneration. He went on to show that iron chelators such as desferal that came to him acted as neuroprotective drugs in 6-hydoxydopamine and MPTP animal moldes of Parkinson's disease.

He identified a drug, AGN1135, that he received from Aspro Nicholas Company in 1968, while he was in Merton Sandler's department, as second potent selective irreversible monoamine oxidase B inhibitor. With John Finberg and Teva Pharmaceutical company they developed the R-isomer of AGN1135 as treatment for Parkinson's disease, the second monoamine oxidase B inhibitor, rasagiline (Azilect). First as initial mono therapy or as add-on therapy to levodopa or dopamine 2 receptor agonists later in the disease. Results of the ADAGIO clinical study suggest that the drug may have a positive impact on slowing clinical progression of the disease.

Youdim's research priorities are in neurosciences, pharmacology, neurotransmitter systems, and neurological diseases, specifically Parkinson’s disease. His primary research is on the monoamine oxidase enzyme and its role in the pathogenesis of Parkinson’s disease and the development of selective inhibitors of this enzyme. Medications developed to inhibit monoamine oxidase B have since become an established method of treating Parkinson’s disease. He also conducts research on other neurodegenerative disorders such as Alzheimer’s disease, focusing on the disruption in cholinergic neurotransmission associated with this disease.

He also pioneered the concept and developedment novel multi target iron chelators with monoamine oxidase and cholinesterase inhibitory activities for treatment of Parkinson's and Alzheimer's diseases and amyotrophic lateral sclerosis (ALS or Lou Gehrig disease).These drugs possess neuroprotective and neurorestorative activities in several animal models of Parkinson's disease.These drugs activate hypoxia inducing factor (HIF) that induces the increase of neurotophins BDNF,GNFD,VEGF in the brain which activate the cell cycle in differentiation of dopamine neurons.

He has been a Distinguished Scientific Professor in universities and institutes around the world including;

- Professor of Pharmacology Uniformed Armed Forces Medical School, Washington DC, USA.
- Janin University, Guangzhou, China.
- Qingdao University, Distinguished Scientific Professor, China.
- Materica Medica of Chinese Academy of Sciences Shanghai University of Traditional Chinese Medicine, Shanghai, China (2010–present).
- Shanghai Rugin University Medical School, Shanghai, China (2010–present).
- Yonsei World Class University Programme Distinguished Scientific Professor, Seoul, South Korea (2008 - 2013).
- Hong Kong Polytechnic University Distinguished Scientific Professor (2006 - 2008).
- Hong Kong University Distinguished Visiting Professor (2007-2020).
- Fogarty International Scholar at the Center for Advanced Study in Human Health Sciences, National Institutes of Health (NIH), USA (1991 - 1999).

From 1997 - 2012 he was a director of the National Parkinson Foundation's Center of Excellence, USA. and the Eve Topf Center of Excellence for Neurodegenerative Diseases at Technion Medical School.

He holds over 100 patents in neuropsychiatric drug development and cardiovascular drugs.

== Publications ==
He has published over 900 scientific articles, which have been cited close to 80,000 times, and his H-Index is 146. He has edited over 45 books.

He has been editorial board member of 43 international scientific journals, including British Journal of Pharmacology, Journal of Neurochemistry, Journal of Neural Transmission, Experimental Neurology, International Neurochemistry, Psychopharmacology. International Journal of Neuropsychopharmacology, Archives of Pharmacology, Frontiers in Pharmacology, European Journal of Pharmacology, Biogenic Amines, Neuropsychobiology, Neurochemical Research; Brain Research, CNS Drug Review, Future Drugs, Drugs of Today, and Neurotherapeutics.

== Key publications ==
- Youdim, Moussa B H; Bakhle, Y S (2006). "Monoamine oxidase: isoforms and inhibitors in Parkinson's disease and depressive illness". British Journal of Pharmacology. 147 (S1): S287–S296. doi:10.1038/sj.bjp.0706464. ISSN 0007-1188. PMC 1760741. PMID 16402116.
- Zecca, Luigi; Youdim, Moussa B. H.; Riederer, Peter; Connor, James R.; Crichton, Robert R. (November 2004). "Iron, brain ageing and neurodegenerative disorders". Nature Reviews Neuroscience. 5 (11): 863–873. doi:10.1038/nrn1537. ISSN 1471-003X. PMID 15496864. S2CID 205500060.
- Youdim, Moussa B. H.; Edmondson, Dale; Tipton, Keith F. (April 2006). "The therapeutic potential of monoamine oxidase inhibitors". Nature Reviews Neuroscience. 7 (4): 295–309. doi:10.1038/nrn1883. ISSN 1471-003X. PMID 16552415. S2CID 1207867.
- Weinreb, Orly; Amit, Tamar; Mandel, Silvia; Kupershmidt, Lana; Youdim, Moussa B.H. (2010-09-15). "Neuroprotective Multifunctional Iron Chelators: From Redox-Sensitive Process to Novel Therapeutic Opportunities". Antioxidants & Redox Signaling. 13 (6): 919–949. doi:10.1089/ars.2009.2929. ISSN 1523-0864. PMID 20095867.

== Prizes and honors ==
Youdim has received more than 50 national and international prizes, awards, honors, several honorary doctorates and Distinguished Professorships. In 1997 he was granted an honorary doctorate from Semmelweis University, Budapest, Hungary; in 1998 from University of Pisa and Scuola Normale Superiore, Pisa, Italy.

- In 2025 he was awarded The Sir Henry J Wellcome Gold Medal the highest prize of British Pharmacology Society for achievement in pharmacology and therapeutics.
- In 2025 he was elected a permanent member of Academia Europaea (European Academy)
- In 2024 he was awarded the Israel Parkinson’s Disease Society Award and the Tel Aviv University Aufzien Center’s Annual Prize for Lifetime Contribution for Parkinson's Disease in recognition of his lifelong dedication and work in the treatment of Parkinson’s disease.
- In 2023 he was awarded the Maimonides Award, Rambam Hospital
- In 2022 he received the Life Sciences Israel Prize in recognition of his "pioneering, groundbreaking scientific achievements in the field of neuropharmacology and neurochemistry".
- In 2013 he was elected an honorary member of Israel Society for Neuroscience
- In 2012 he was granted CINP (International College of Neuropsychopharmacology) Pioneering Neuropsychopharmacology Prize
- In 2010 he was awarded the ECNP (European College of Neuropsychopharmacology) LifeTime Achievement Award.
- In 2010 he was elected to the Leopoldina Germany Academy of Sciences.
- In 2010 he received the EMET prize in Brain Science "for his achievements in the field of neurological studies and his studies of Parkinson’s and Alzheimer’s diseases, leading to the development of drugs for the treatment of these severe diseases.”
- In 2007 Melvin Yahr Lecture in Parkinson's Disease, Mount Sinai School of Medicine, New York, USA.
- In 2006 Henry Taub Prize for Excellence in Research, Technion Israel.
- In 1999 Shepard Foundation International Neurodegenerative Diseases Lecture”, University of Florida, Tallahassee, USA.
- In 1995 and 2000 Hershel Rich Inovation Prize, Technion, Haifa.
- In 1994 and 1997 Henning Andersen International Prize (Stockholm, Sweden).
- In 1991 Deutscher Neuropharmakologie (AGNP) Prize (Nurnburg, Germany)
- In 1991 Eli Lilly Prize for Neuropsychopharmacology (Indianapolis, USA)
- In 1991 The B. Zondek Prize, Israel Endocrinology Society (Tel Aviv, Israel)
- In 1992 The Israel Fertility Society Prize (Tel Aviv, Israel)
- In 1990 Senator Burda International Prize for Parkinson’s Disease (Vienna, Austria).
- In 1986 he received the Michael Landau Brain Research Prize, Israel.
- In 1980 he received the National Institute of Psychobiology in Israel Research Achievement Prize.
- In 1978 he received The Royal Medal and Insignia from the Shah Of Iran in Teheran.
- In 1974 he received the Anna-Monika International Prize,Basel and British Migraine Association Special Gold Medal,London.
- In 1991 Claudius Galenus Gold Medal Prize for Parkinson Disease, l-Deprenyl Drug of the Year (Berlin, Germany)

In honor of his 80th birthday a special issues of Neurochemical Research and Journal of Neural Transmission were dedicated to him were published.

== Youdim family lecture and prize ==
He established the Annual Eliahoo Youdim Lecture in depression at National Institue of Psychobiology in Israel in honor of his father who suffered from depression throughout his life.

In 2013 he established The Youdim Family Cancer Prize at Rambam Hospital in Haifa whose family suffered from various cancer, granted annually to researchers for medical or biomedical cancer research which demonstrates excellence, novelty, and/or scientific breakthroughs. As of 2021 two annual grants are awarded to cancer research PhD students nearing completion of their degrees at an Israeli academic institution.

== Industry involvement ==
Youdim was a consultant to Roche, TEVA Pharmaceuticals Ltd; Ciba Geigy, and Continental Pharmaceuticals, Brussels.

He founded Abital Pharma in 2012 and Youdim Pharmaceuticals in 2016 and is president and chief scientific officer.

He is a discoverer of the anti-Parkinson drugs selelgiline (l-deprenyl) and developer of monoamine oxidase B inhibitor rasagiline (Azilect), which was considered to be the first disease modifying drug used for Parkinson's disease and TVP 3326, ladostigil, for Alzheimer's disease. Experts have recently questioned whether rasagiline actually has significant disease modifying properties.
