= Journal of Neural Transmission =

- Discipline: Clinical neurology Translational neuroscience
- Language: English
- Edited by: Peter Riederer

Publication details
- Former name(s): Acta Neurovegetativa; Journal of Neuro-Visceral Relations
- History: 1950–present
- Publisher: Springer Science+Business Media
- Frequency: Monthly
- Impact factor: 3.505 (2019)

Standard abbreviations
- ISO 4: J. Neural Transm. (Vienna)

Indexing
- CODEN: JNTRF3
- ISSN: 0300-9564 (print); 1435-1463 (web)
- OCLC no.: 956041026

Links
- Journal homepage; Online archive

The Journal of Neural Transmission is a monthly peer-reviewed medical journal covering clinical neurology and translational neuroscience. It was established in 1950 by Carmen Coronini and Alexander Sturm as Acta Neurovegetativa. It was renamed to the Journal of Neuro-Visceral Relations in 1968 and to its current title in 1972. From 1989 to 1995, the journal was published in two sections: a "general section" and a "Parkinson's disease and dementia section." The editor-in-chief is Peter Riederer. According to the Journal Citation Reports, the journal has a 2019 impact factor of 3.505.
