= Klaus Conrad =

Nazi neurologist and psychiatrist

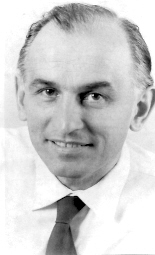
Klaus Conrad

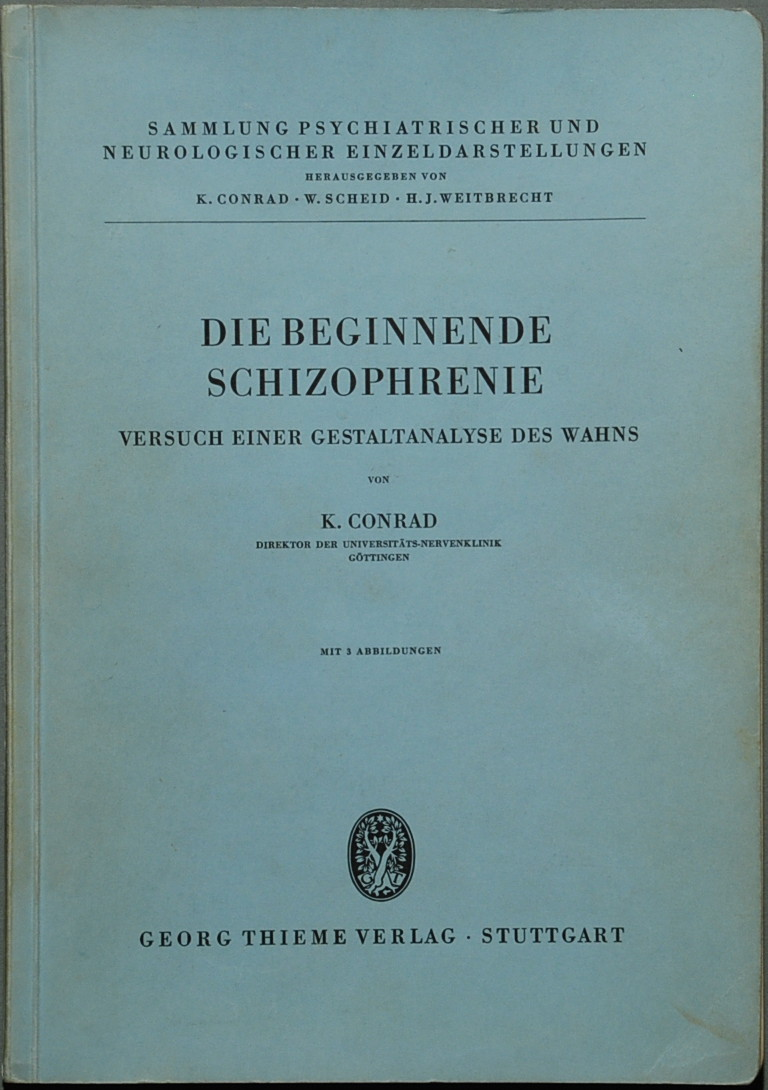
Die beginnende Schizophrenie. Versuch einer Gestaltanalyse des Wahns

Klaus Conrad (19 June 1905 in Reichenberg – 5 May 1961 in Göttingen) was a Sudeten German neurologist and psychiatrist who conducted research on German soldiers who were hospitalised with mental health symptoms on the Eastern Front during the Second World War. Aaron Mishara has claimed that his work constituted an important contribution to neuropsychology and psychopathology.

He joined the Nazi Party (NSDAP) in 1940. He had a post war career as a professor of psychiatry and neurology, and director of the University Psychiatric Hospital in Göttingen from 1958 until his death.

Conrad's main work: Die beginnende Schizophrenie: Versuch einer Gestaltanalyse des Wahns (1958), describes the early state of schizophrenia and the typical schizophrenic aspects. From this monograph, terms as "Trema", "Apophänie" (apophany), and "Überstieg" were coined. Frank Fish, who had reviewed Conrad's book in 1960, used Conrad's approach in a neuropsychiatric case report the same year. An English language summary of Conrad's work and its influence was published in 2010 by Mishara.
