= Neuroimmune system =

Interactions in the immune system

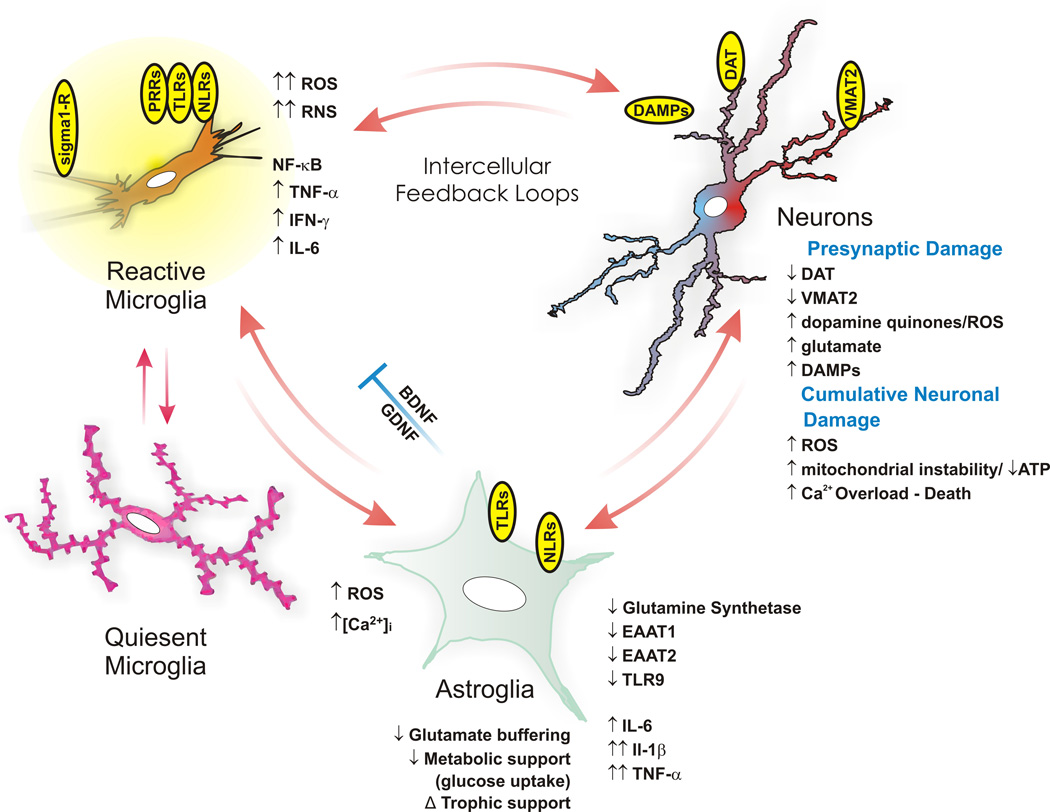
- This diagram depicts the neuroimmune mechanisms that mediate methamphetamine-induced neurodegeneration in the human brain. The NF-κB-mediated neuroimmune response to methamphetamine use which results in the increased permeability of the blood–brain barrier arises through its binding at and activation of sigma-1 receptors, the increased production of reactive oxygen species (ROS), reactive nitrogen species (RNS), and damage-associated molecular pattern molecules (DAMPs), the dysregulation of glutamate transporters (specifically, EAAT1 and EAAT2) and glucose metabolism, and excessive calcium influx in glial cells and dopamine neurons.

Details
- System: Neuroimmune

Identifiers
- MeSH: D015213

The neuroimmune system is a system of structures and processes involving the biochemical and electrophysiological interactions between the nervous system and immune system which protect neurons from pathogens. It serves to protect neurons against disease by maintaining selectively permeable barriers (e.g., the blood–brain barrier and blood–cerebrospinal fluid barrier), mediating neuroinflammation and wound healing in damaged neurons, and mobilizing host defences against pathogens.

The neuroimmune system and peripheral immune system are structurally distinct. Unlike the peripheral system, the neuroimmune system is composed primarily of glial cells; among all the hematopoietic cells of the immune system, only mast cells are normally present in the neuroimmune system. However, during a neuroimmune response, certain peripheral immune cells are able to cross various blood or fluid–brain barriers in order to respond to pathogens that have entered the brain. For example, there is evidence that following injury macrophages and T cells of the immune system migrate into the spinal cord. Production of immune cells of the complement system have also been documented as being created directly in the central nervous system.

== Structure ==
The key cellular components of the neuroimmune system are glial cells, including astrocytes, microglia, and oligodendrocytes. Unlike other hematopoietic cells of the peripheral immune system, mast cells naturally occur in the brain where they mediate interactions between gut microbes, the immune system, and the central nervous system as part of the microbiota–gut–brain axis.

G protein-coupled receptors that are present in both CNS and immune cell types and which are responsible for a neuroimmune signaling process include:

- Chemokine receptors: CXCR4
- Cannabinoid receptors: CB1, CB2, GPR55
- Trace amine-associated receptors: TAAR1
- μ-Opioid receptors – all subtypes

Neuroimmunity is additionally mediated by the enteric nervous system, namely the interactions of enteric neurons and glial cells. These engage with enteroendocrine cells and local macrophages, sensing signals from the gut lumen, including those from the microbiota. These signals prompt local immune responses and transmit to the CNS through humoral and neural pathways. Interleukins and signals from immune cells can access the hypothalamus via the neurovascular unit or circumventricular organs.

== Cellular physiology ==
The neuro-immune system, and study of, comprises an understanding of the immune and neurological systems and the cross-regulatory impacts of their functions. Cytokines regulate immune responses, possibly through activation of the hypothalamic-pituitary-adrenal (HPA) axis. Cytokines have also been implicated in the coordination between the nervous and immune systems. Instances of cytokine binding to neural receptors have been documented between the cytokine releasing immune cell IL-1 β and the neural receptor IL-1R. This binding results in an electrical impulse that creates the sensation of pain. Growing evidence suggests that auto-immune T-cells are involved in neurogenesis. Studies have shown that during times of adaptive immune system response, hippocampal neurogenesis is increased, and conversely that auto-immune T-cells and microglia are important for neurogenesis (and so memory and learning) in healthy adults.

The neuroimmune system uses complementary processes of both sensory neurons and immune cells to detect and respond to noxious or harmful stimuli. For example, invading bacteria may simultaneously activate inflammasomes, which process interleukins (IL-1 β), and depolarize sensory neurons through the secretion of hemolysins. Hemolysins create pores causing a depolarizing release of potassium ions from inside the eukaryotic cell and an influx of calcium ions. Together this results in an action potential in sensory neurons and the activation of inflammasomes.

Injury and necrosis also cause a neuroimmune response. The release of adenosine triphosphate (ATP) from damaged cells binds to and activates both P2X7 receptors on macrophages of the immune system, and P2X3 receptors of nociceptors of the nervous system. This causes the combined response of both a resulting action potential due to the depolarization created by the influx of calcium and potassium ions, and the activation of inflammasomes. The produced action potential is also responsible for the sensation of pain, and the immune system produces IL-1 β as a result of the ATP P2X7 receptor binding.

Although inflammation is typically thought of as an immune response, there is an orchestration of neural processes involved with the inflammatory process of the immune system. Following injury or infection, there is a cascade of inflammatory responses such as the secretion of cytokines and chemokines that couple with the secretion of neuropeptides (such as substance P) and neurotransmitters (such as serotonin). Together, this coupled neuroimmune response has an amplifying effect on inflammation.

== Neuroimmune responses ==
=== Neuron-glial cell interaction ===
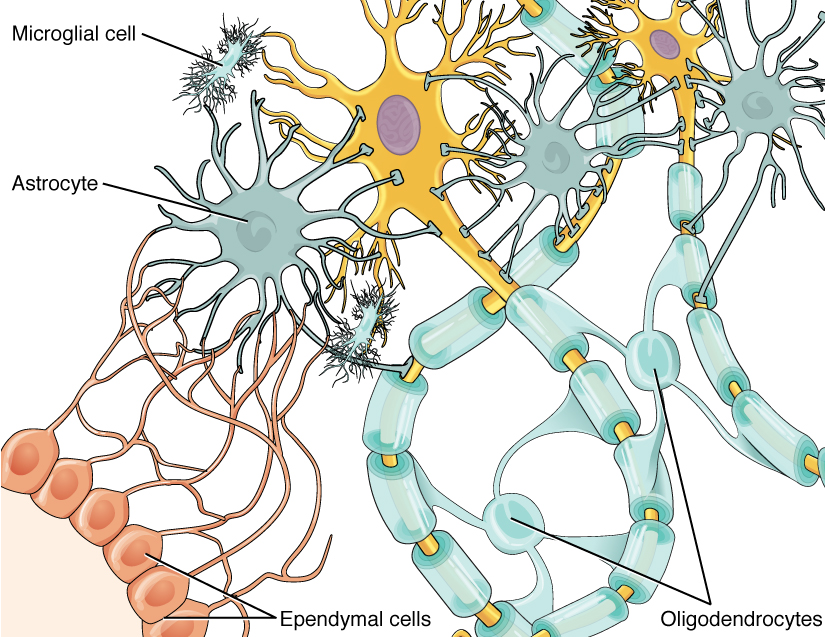
Different types of glial cells including microglia, astrocytes and oligodendrocytes.

Neurons and glial cells work in conjunction to combat intruding pathogens and injury. Chemokines play a prominent role as a mediator between neuron-glial cell communication since both cell types express chemokine receptors. For example, the chemokine fractalkine has been implicated in communication between microglia and dorsal root ganglion (DRG) neurons in the spinal cord. Fractalkine has been associated with hypersensitivity to pain when injected in vivo, and has been found to upregulate inflammatory mediating molecules. Glial cells can effectively recognize pathogens in both the central nervous system and in peripheral tissues. When glial cells recognize foreign pathogens through the use of cytokine and chemokine signalling, they are able to relay this information to the CNS. The result is an increase in depressive symptoms. Chronic activation of glial cells however leads to neuroinflammation, and neurodegeneration.

Microglial cells are of the most prominent types of glial cells in the brain. One of their main functions is phagocytosing cellular debris following neuronal apoptosis. Following apoptosis, dead neurons secrete chemical signals that bind to microglial cells and cause them to devour harmful debris from the surrounding nervous tissue. Microglia and the complement system are also associated with synaptic pruning as their secretions of cytokines, growth factors and other complements all aid in the removal of obsolete synapses.

Astrocytes are another type of glial cell that among other functions, modulate the entry of immune cells into the CNS via the blood–brain barrier (BBB). Astrocytes also release various cytokines and neurotrophins that allow for immune cell entry into the CNS; these recruited immune cells target both pathogens and damaged nervous tissue.

=== Reflexes ===
==== Withdrawal reflex ====
Withdrawal reflex

The withdrawal reflex is a reflex that protects an organism from harmful stimuli. This reflex occurs when noxious stimuli activate nociceptors that send an action potential to nerves in the spine, which then innervate effector muscles and cause a sudden jerk to move the organism away from the dangerous stimuli. The withdrawal reflex involves both the nervous and immune systems. When the action potential travels back down the spinal nerve network, another impulse travels to peripheral sensory neurons that secrete amino acids and neuropeptides like calcitonin gene-related peptide (CGRP) and Substance P. These chemicals act by increasing the redness, swelling of damaged tissues, and attachment of immune cells to endothelial tissue, thereby increasing the permeability of immune cells across capillaries.

==== Reflex response to pathogens and toxins ====
Neuroimmune interactions also occur when pathogens, allergens, or toxins invade an organism. The vagus nerve connects to the gut and airways and elicits nerve impulses to the brainstem in response to the detection of toxins and pathogens. This electrical impulse that travels down from the brain stem travels to mucosal cells and stimulates the secretion of mucus; this impulse can also cause ejection of the toxin by muscle contractions that cause vomiting or diarrhea.

Neuroimmune connections and the vagus nerve have also been highlighted more recently as essential to maintaining homeostasis in the context of novel viruses such as SARS-CoV-2 This is especially relevant when considering the role of the vagus nerve in regulating systemic inflammation via the Cholinergic Anti-inflammatory Pathway.

==== Reflex response to parasites ====
The neuroimmune system is involved in reflexes associated with parasitic invasions of hosts. Nociceptors are also associated with the body's reflexes to pathogens as they are in strategic locations, such as airways and intestinal tissues, to induce muscle contractions that cause scratching, vomiting, and coughing. These reflexes are all designed to eject pathogens from the body. For example, scratching is induced by pruritogens that stimulate nociceptors on epidermal tissues. These pruritogens, like histamine, also cause other immune cells to secrete further pruritogens in an effort to cause more itching to physically remove parasitic invaders. In terms of intestinal and bronchial parasites, vomiting, coughing, sneezing, and diarrhoea can also be caused by nociceptor stimulation in infected tissues, and nerve impulses originating from the brain stem that innervate respective smooth muscles.

Eosinophils in response to capsaicin, can trigger further sensory sensitization to the molecule. Patients with chronic cough also have an enhanced cough reflex to pathogens even if the pathogen has been expelled. In both cases, the release of eosinophils and other immune molecules cause a hypersensitization of sensory neurons in bronchial airways that produce enhanced symptoms. It has also been reported that increased immune cell secretions of neurotrophins in response to pollutants and irritants can restructure the peripheral network of nerves in the airways to allow for a more primed state for sensory neurons.

== Clinical significance ==
It has been demonstrated that prolonged psychological stress could be linked with increased risk of infection via viral respiratory infection. Studies, in animals, indicate that psychological stress raises glucocorticoid levels and eventually, an increase in susceptibility to streptococcal skin infections.

The neuroimmune system plays a role in Alzheimer's disease. In particular, microglia may be protective by promoting phagocytosis and removal of amyloid-β (Aβ) deposits, but also become dysfunctional as disease progresses, producing neurotoxins, ceasing to clear Aβ deposits, and producing cytokines that further promote Aβ deposition. It has been shown that in Alzheimer's disease, amyloid-β directly activates microglia and other monocytes to produce neurotoxins.

Astrocytes have also been implicated in multiple sclerosis (MS). Astrocytes are responsible for demyelination and the destruction of oligodendrocytes that is associated with the disease. This demyelinating effect is a result of the secretion of cytokines and matrix metalloproteinases (MMP) from activated astrocyte cells onto neighbouring neurons. Astrocytes that remain in an activated state form glial scars that also prevent the re-myelination of neurons, as they are a physical impediment to oligodendrocyte progenitor cells (OPCs).

The neuroimmune system is essential for increasing plasticity following a CNS injury via an increase in excitability and a decrease in inhibition, which leads to synaptogenesis and a restructuring of neurons. The neuroimmune system may play a role in recovery outcomes after a CNS injury.

The neuroimmune system is also involved in asthma and chronic cough, as both are a result of the hypersensitized state of sensory neurons due to the release of immune molecules and positive feedback mechanisms.

Preclinical and clinical studies have shown that cellular (microglia/macrophages, leukocytes, astrocytes, and mast cells, etc.) and molecular neuroimmune responses contribute to secondary brain injury after intracerebral haemorrhage.

== See also ==
- Central nervous system
- Immune system
- Immunology
- Neurology
