= Gerard Sanacora =

Gerard Sanacora is an American translational neuroscientist.

Upon earning his bachelor's degree from Stony Brook University in 1986, Sanacora entered the Medical Scientist Training Program, completing his doctorate and medical degree at Stony Brook in 1992 and 1994, respectively. He joined the Yale School of Medicine, where he was named George D. Gross and Esther S. Gross Professor of Psychiatry in 2018. Sanacora is a fellow of the American College of Neuropsychopharmacology.
