= Max Hamilton =

German psychiatrist

- Born: Max Hamilton; 12 April 1912; Offenbach am Main, Germany
- Died: 9 September 1988 (aged 76)
- Education: University of London
- Scientific career
- Fields: Psychiatry, Psychometrics
- Workplaces: University of London; University of Leeds

Max Hamilton (12 April 1912 – 9 September 1988) was a German-Jewish psychiatrist.

== Life ==
Hamilton was born at Offenbach am Main, Germany. He migrated to England with his family (named Himmelschein) in 1914, aged 1 1/2 years. He was educated at the Central Foundation Boys' School in Cowper Street and went on to study medicine at University College Hospital, London. He qualified with the Conjoint Diploma (L.R.C.P. London, M.R.C.S. England) in 1934 and obtained the degrees of Bachelor of Medicine, Bachelor of Surgery (M.B. B.S.) in 1937 from the University of London. Having worked for a time as a general practitioner in the East End of London, he served as a medical officer in the Royal Air Force during World War II. Having gained the Diploma in Psychological Medicine in 1945, Hamilton began his training as a psychiatrist at the Maudsley Hospital, London where, reputedly, he had difficulties with the rigid establishment.

He returned to University College Hospital as a part-time lecturer from 1945-1947 where he worked under the influence of Sir Cyril Burt who recognized Hamilton's mathematical talent and advised him to train in medical statistics. In the event, Hamilton became an innovative statistician and by the late 1940s (years before Kayser in the USA), he had already suggested that factors (in factor analysis) should be rotated.

He went on to work as senior registrar to Dennis Hill at King's College Hospital (from where he submitted his MD thesis on the personalities of patients with dyspepsia) and then worked for two years at Tooting Bec Hospital, in the diminished position of senior hospital medical officer. In 1953, Hamilton was appointed senior lecturer in psychiatry at the University of Leeds.

In 1959 and 1960 he published the Hamilton Anxiety and Hamilton Depression Rating Scales.

After working for two years as a visiting scientist at the National Institute of Mental Health, Bethesda, Maryland, USA, he became a member of the external staff of the Medical Research Council and in 1963 succeeded Ronald Hargreaves as the Nuffield Professor of Psychiatry at the University of Leeds, a post he held until his retirement in 1977.

He was one of the first to introduce psychometrics into psychiatry and to convince a then rather incredulous profession that psychiatric research had to be based on measurement and statistical analysis. He was the Foundation President of the British Association for Psychopharmacology, an honorary fellow of the Royal College of Psychiatrists and one of the few psychiatrist Presidents of the British Psychological Society. In 1980 he received, from the American Psychopathological Association, the coveted Paul Hoch prize for distinguished psychiatric research.

He died in 1988, just two months before he was due to deliver the Maudsley Lecture.

== Books ==
- Psychosomatics. New York: Wiley (1955)
- Lectures on the Methodology of Clinical Research. Edinburgh: Livingstone (1961)
- Fish's Schizophrenia. Second Edition. Bristol: John Wright (1976)
- Fish's Clinical Psychopathology. Second Edition. Bristol: John Wright (1985) ISBN 0 7236 0605 6
