= Peter Riederer =

German neuroscientist (born 1942)

Peter Franz Riederer (born 21 March 1942) is a German neuroscientist with several thousands of citations and around 950 scientific writings. He has published more than 620 scientific papers in peer-reviewed scientific journals that are indexed in Medline. He has been author and co-author of more than 20 books relevant to the fields of neuroscience, psychiatry and neurology.

== Biography ==
Peter Franz Riederer was born in Königsberg, then part of Germany (now Kaliningrad, Russia). He holds bachelor's and doctorate degrees in Technical Chemistry from the Technical University of Vienna.

Before he embraced neuroscience he had completed scientific studies at the Nuclear reactor Center Seibersdorf in Austria.

At the Ludwig Boltzmann Institute in Vienna he was introduced to the field of neurochemistry and neuroscience by Walther Birkmayer, who was a head of the L. Boltzmann Institute of Neurochemistry and head of the Department of Neurology at Lainz Hospital. Birkmayer was the first doctor who was administering Levodopa in the treatment of Parkinson's disease.

From 1971 to 1986 Riederer served as Chief of Clinical Neurochemistry at the Ludwig Boltzmann Institute conducting numerous studies on postmortem brains of patients with neurological and psychiatric diseases.

As he was invited by German psychiatrist Helmut Beckmann to join Psychiatry and Psychotherapy Clinic of the Medical School of the University of Würzburg, Germany, he moved to Würzburg in 1986 and since on has been serving as a chief of Neurochemistry laboratory at the Clinic.

In cooperation with Beckmann and dozens of other world scientists including Nobel Laureate Arvid Carlsson whom he succeeded at the position of Editor in Chief of the Journal of Neural Transmission, Riederer has focused his research on the neurotransmitters/receptors analysis and gene profiling of various neuropsychiatric diseases (depression, schizophrenia, neurodegenerative disorders such as Parkinson's and Alzheimer's disease), neuroprotection, treatment of neuropsychiatric disorders etc. Among his coauthors have been Moussa B.H. Youdim, Helmut Beckmann, Klaus-Peter Lesch and Johannes Kornhuber.

Peter Franz Riederer has served as President of the European Association for Clinical Neuropharmacology, President of the German Society of Biological Psychiatry, board member of Research Committee of the World Federation of Neurology on Parkinsonism and Related Disorders, President of the German Association of Biological Psychiatry, President of the German Parkinson's Association, Vice President of the German Society of Biological Psychiatry, Vice President of the German Parkinson Society, and numerous other positions.

He has been member of scientific committees of numerous international conferences and congresses in the field of neuroscience and neuropsychiatry and also presided over the Organisation of the International Biological Psychiatry Conference (Berlin, 2001), the 16th International Congress on Parkinson's disease and Related Disorders (Berlin, 2005), the 39th International Danubian Symposium on Neuroscience (Würzburg, 2007), and the 1st International Conference on Attention Deficit/Hyperactivity Disorder (ADHD, Würzburg, 2007).

Riederer has received 14 international awards and was sitting in the editorial and advisory boards of various peer-reviewed scientific journals including Journal of Neural Transmission, Amino Acid, New Trends in Clinical Neuropharmacology, Biogenic Amines, Functional Neurology, International Journal of Neuropsychopharmacology, Neurology Psychiatry and Brain Research, Neuropsychobiologie, Parkionsonism & Related Disorders.

He also serves as Head of the Brain Bank Centre in Würzburg and is active in the BrainNet Europe II initiative.

On 2008 he received the Honoris Causa Doctorate form the International University of Catalonia.

He is married and has one son.

== Sources ==
- Universitätsklinikum Würzburg: Startseite
- Birkmayer, Walther
- Helmut Beckmann (1940–2006)
