= Klaus-Peter Lesch =

German clinical psychiatrist

Klaus-Peter Lesch is a German clinical psychiatrist who has been investigating the neurobiological foundation of personality traits.

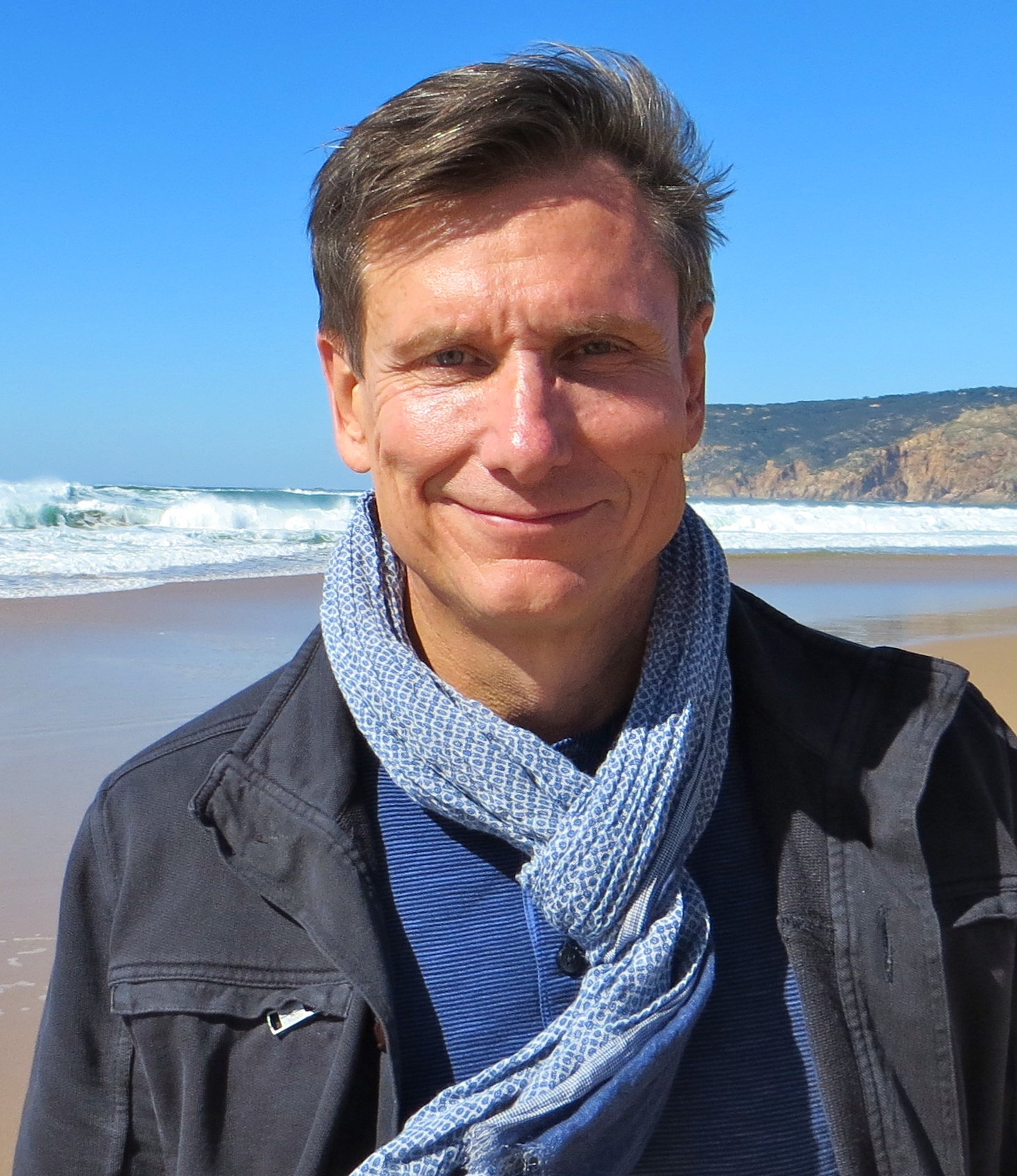
Klaus-Peter Lesch 2014

His 1996 paper on the association between the 5-HTTLPR polymorphism in the serotonin transporter gene and the personality trait neuroticism has been highly cited and was one of the first papers in personality genetics.

He is professor at the University of Würzburg. Among his coauthors has been Peter Riederer. In 2008, he received the ECNP Neuropsychopharmacology Award.

== Important Publications ==
- Lesch KP, Bengel D, Heils A, Sabol SZ, Greenberg BD, Petri S, Benjamin J, Müller CR, Hamer DH, Murphy DL (1996). "Association of anxiety-related traits with a polymorphism in the serotonin transporter gene regulatory region". Science. 274 (5292): 1527–1532. Bibcode:1996Sci...274.1527L. doi:10.1126/science.274.5292.1527. PMID 8929413. S2CID 35503987.
- Canli T, Lesch KP (2007). "Long story short: the serotonin transporter in emotion regulation and social cognition". Nature Neuroscience. 10 (9): 1103–1109. doi:10.1038/nn1964. PMID 17726476. S2CID 7624807.
- Murphy DL, Lesch KP (2008). "Targeting the murine serotonin transporter: insights into human neurobiology". Nat Rev Neurosci. 9 (2): 85–96. doi:10.1038/nrn2284. PMID 18209729. S2CID 7563088.
- Lesch KP, Selch S, Renner TJ, Jacob C, Nguyen TT, Hahn T, Romanos M, Shoichet S, Dempfle A, Heine M, Boreatti-Hümmer A, Walitza S, Romanos J, Gross-Lesch S, Zerlaut H, Allolio B, Heinzel S, Fassnacht M, Fallgatter A, Wultsch T, Schäfer H, Warnke A, Reif A, Ropers HH, Ullmann R (2011). "Genome-wide copy number variation analysis in ADHD: association with neuropeptide Y gene dosage in an extended pedigree" (PDF). Mol Psychiatry. 16 (5): 491–503. doi:10.1038/mp.2010.29. PMID 20308990. S2CID 14391076.
- Lesch KP, Waider J (2012). "Serotonin in the modulation of neural plasticity and networks: implications for neurodevelopmental disorders". Neuron. 76 (1): 175–191. doi:10.1016/j.neuron.2012.09.013. PMID 23040814.
