= Johannes Kornhuber =

German psychiatrist and psychotherapist (born 1959)

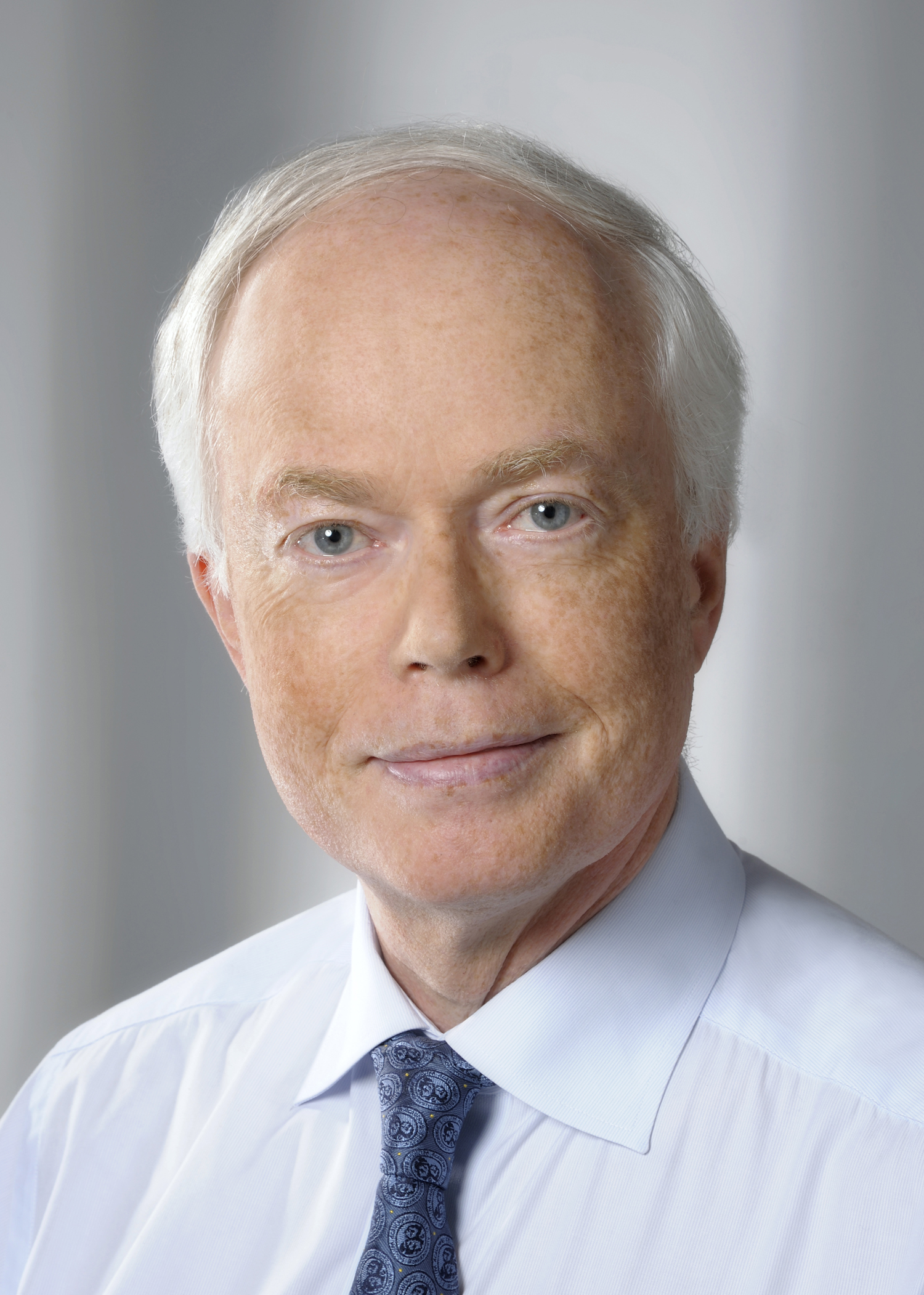
- Kornhuber in 2014
- Born: 11 September 1959 (age 67); Freiburg im Breisgau, Germany
- Occupations: Psychiatrist and Psychotherapist

Johannes Kornhuber (born 11 September 1959) is a German psychiatrist and psychotherapist.

== Work ==
His research interests include the pathophysiology of Alzheimer’s disease, the early diagnosis and treatment of dementia syndromes, the pathophysiology of alcohol addiction and the pathophysiology of major depressive disorder. He has authored or co-authored more than 400 Journal articles. Kornhuber described novel molecular mechanisms of approved psychotropic drugs, namely that memantine, amantadine, budipine and orphenadrine act as low-affinity NMDA-receptor antagonists. The data obtained with memantine formed an important basis for its worldwide approval as an antidementive drug. Kornhuber developed the pharmacokinetic hypothesis explaining the delayed therapeutic effects of antidepressant drugs. Furthermore, he found that antidepressant drugs like amitriptyline and fluoxetine mediate their effects on neurogenesis and behavior by lowering ceramide abundance in the brain. Among his coauthors has been Peter Riederer.

== Honors ==
- Scientific Award of the German Society for Psychiatry (1990)
- Organon-Award of the German Society for Biological Psychiatry (1990)
- Rafaelsen Award of the Collegium Internationale Neuro-Psychopharmacologicum (1994)
- Scientific Award of the Senator Dr. Franz Burda-Foundation (1995)
- Klaesi-Award, Swiss Academy of Medical Sciences (1995)
- Scientific Award for Psychopharmacology of the AGNP (1999)
- Ehrenpreis – Deutscher Förderpreis für Schmerzforschung und Schmerztherapie (2000)
- Award „ZukunftErfindenNRW“ Der HochschulWettbewerb 2011 3. Preis (together with Wiltfang J, Maler M, et al.) (2011)
- Annika Liese-Award (together with Gulbins E) (2014)
- Awards for Good Teaching, University of Erlangen-Nuremberg (2006, 2010, 2013, 2014, 2015)
