= Hamilton Anxiety Rating Scale =

Questionnaire to rate anxiety severity

- Purpose: rate severity of anxiety

The Hamilton Anxiety Rating Scale (HAM-A) is a psychological questionnaire used by clinicians to rate the severity of a patient's anxiety. Anxiety can refer to things such as "a mental state...a drive...a response to a particular situation…a personality trait...and a psychiatric disorder." Though it was one of the first anxiety rating scales to be published, the HAM-A remains widely used by clinicians. It was originally published by Max Hamilton in 1959. For clinical purposes, and the purpose of this scale, only severe or improper anxiety is attended to. This scale is considered a "clinical rating" of the extensiveness of anxiety, and is intended for individuals that are "already diagnosed with anxiety neurosis."

The scale consists of 14 items designed to assess the severity of a patient's anxiety. Each of the 14 items contains a number of symptoms, and each group of symptoms is rated on a scale of zero to four, with four being the most severe. All of these scores are used to compute an overarching score that indicates a person's anxiety severity. The Hamilton Anxiety Rating scale has been considered a valuable scale for many years, but the ever-changing definition of anxiety, new technology, and new research has had an effect on the scale's perceived usefulness. As a result, there have been changes, and challenges, to the original version of the scale over time.

== History ==
In 1959, Max R Hamilton developed the first version of the Hamilton Anxiety Rating Scale. He included a distinction "between anxiety as a normal reaction to danger, anxiety as a pathological condition not related to stress, and anxiety as a state or broad syndrome that he termed "anxiety neurosis.'" Hamilton developed the scale to be used with patients already known to suffer from anxiety neurosis, not to be used as a means of diagnosing anxiety in patients with other disorders. Although Hamilton developed the scale as a rating of severity, he used his scale to differentiate "anxiety as a pathological mood" from a "state (or neurosis)." He used common methods for designing the rating scale. A variety of relevant symptoms were collected and divided into groups. The scale started with twelve groups of symptoms, which came to form thirteen scale variables. All of the thirteen variables were described by succinct statements and included on a sheet that was used by an interviewer for assessing a patient. The original version used a "five-point scale" for rating the groups of symptoms. The first version of the scale was only a start, and as Hamilton stated, "Some of the variables are obviously a rag-bag of oddments and need further investigation." He conducted tests on the original scale that initiated improvement and, over time, evolved the structure and scoring of the scale to its present state.

== Structure ==
The Hamilton Anxiety Rating Scale is a clinician-rated evaluation whose purpose is to analyze the severity of anxiety. The scale is intended for adults, adolescents, and children and should take approximately ten to fifteen minutes to administer. The scale is a public document. Since it is in the public domain, it is widely available for administration.

The Hamilton Anxiety Rating Scale is composed of fourteen items. On the scale, each item is presented in a specific format. Following the item number, the item itself is listed along with a brief description of the criterion. This description is in the form of a short phrase that elaborates on the item and provides specificity to the clinician regarding the appropriate evaluation. Adjacent to each item is a five-point scale, displaying the numerals 0 to 4 outlined by a square. To learn more about the specific scoring regarding the Hamilton Anxiety Rating Scale, please proceed to the Scoring section. Each criterion on the scale is an independent feeling that is related to anxiety. The collaboration of each of these independently rated criteria are meant to evaluate a patient's anxiety severity. Below are the verbatim criteria and their brief definitions (as described above) as presented in the Hamilton Anxiety Rating Scale:

1. Anxious mood: Worries, anticipation of the worst, fearful anticipation, irritability.
2. Tension: Feelings of tension, fatigability, startle response, moved to tears easily, trembling, feelings of restlessness, inability to relax.
3. Fears: Of dark, of strangers, of being left alone, of animals, of traffic, of crowds.
4. Insomnia: Difficulty in falling asleep, broken sleep, unsatisfying sleep and fatigue on waking, dreams, nightmares, night terrors.
5. Intellectual: Difficulty in concentration, poor memory.
6. Depressed mood: Loss of interest, lack of pleasure in hobbies, depression, early waking, diurnal swing.
7. Somatic (muscular): Pains and aches, twitching, stiffness, myoclonic jerks, grinding of teeth, unsteady voice, increased muscular tone.
8. Somatic (sensory): Tinnitus, blurring of vision, hot and cold flushes, feelings of weakness, pricking sensation.
9. Cardiovascular symptoms: Tachycardia, palpitations, pain in chest, throbbing of vessels, fainting feelings, missing beat.
10. Respiratory symptoms: Pressure or constriction in chest, choking feelings, sighing, dyspnea.
11. Gastrointestinal symptoms: Difficulty in swallowing, wind abdominal pain, burning sensations, abdominal fullness, nausea, vomiting, borborygmi, looseness of bowels, loss of weight, constipation.
12. Genitourinary symptoms: Frequency of micturition, urgency of micturition, amenorrhea, menorrhagia, development of frigidity, premature ejaculation, loss of libido, impotence.
13. Autonomic symptoms: Dry mouth, flushing, pallor, tendency to sweat, giddiness, tension headache, raising of hair.
14. Behavior at interview: Fidgeting, restlessness or pacing, tremor of hands, furrowed brow, strained face, sighing or rapid respiration, facial pallor, swallowing, etc.

== Scoring ==
The Hamilton Anxiety Rating Scale is clinician-rated scale that is intended to provide an analysis of the severity of anxiety in adults, adolescents, and children. It is scored based upon the composite rating of fourteen individually evaluated criteria. Please refer to the Structure section for a complete list and description of the items and the procedure.

The evaluator is instructed to assess the extent to which the patient displays the given criterion. Each item is scored independently based on a five-point, ratio scale. A rating of 0 indicates that the feeling is not present in the patient. A rating of 1 indicates mild prevalence of the feeling in the patient. A rating of 2 indicates moderate prevalence of the feeling in the patient. A rating of 3 indicates severe prevalence of the feeling in the patient. A rating of 4 indicates a very severe prevalence of the feeling in the patient. To implement the Hamilton Anxiety Rating Scale, the acting clinician proceeds through the fourteen items, evaluating each criterion independently in form of the five-point scale described above.

Upon the completion of the evaluation, the clinician compiles a total, composite score based upon the summation of each of the 14 individually rated items. This calculation will yield a comprehensive score in the range of 0 to 56. It has been predetermined that the results of the evaluation can be interpreted as follows. A score of 17 or less indicates mild anxiety severity. A score from 18 to 24 indicates mild to moderate anxiety severity. Lastly, a score of 25 to 30 indicates a moderate to severe anxiety severity.

== Criticisms ==
Issues that arise when using Hamilton Anxiety Rating Scale (HAM-A) have to do with how the clinician interprets the results, changes in the classification of anxiety disorder, symptoms being assessed, and newer measurements that may be more suitable for the particular subject.

Clinician's administration HARS and may influence the subject by how they explain the question. Interpretation of the subjects response may also be hindered by the clinician even when methods are present to prevent interviewer biases.

HAM-A was created before the DSM-III, which changed generalized anxiety disorder into a disorder of worry (which is not covered by HAM-A). DSM-IV defined generalized anxiety disorder as excessive and uncontrollable worry in which HAM-A doesn't accurately cover the main symptom (worry). Symptoms that HAM-A addresses are respiratory, cardiovascular, and gastrointestinal which are not included in the DSM-IV associated symptoms of generalized anxiety disorder. The current HAM-A scale is poor at showing a difference between generalized anxiety disorder and depression due to changes in the DSM, newer measurements, and possible clinician error.

Computer administered Hamilton Anxiety Rating Scale has shown to be almost as effective as the clinician-administered version. There was a mean score difference between the two forms that would be considered statistically significant but not clinically. This statistical significance was not found in the mean score difference in subjects with anxiety disorders. Another area that showed a significant difference was in variance scores (this was found in both forms). Other disadvantages of using a computer for the HAM-A include, "difficulty in evaluating nonverbal symptomatology, and patient's reactions to being interviewed by a computer. Although reactions to being interviewed by the computer were generally positive, most subjects preferred being interviewed by the clinician." One of the biggest drawbacks of taking the HAM-A on a computer is the loss of nonverbal body language in which the clinician would normally be able to take into account when looking at the scores.
