= Edda Neele =

German psychiatrist

Edda Neele (born 15 December 1910 in Elberfeld, Wuppertal, died 16 February 2005) was a German psychiatrist, and a student and collaborator of Karl Kleist, who worked at the Goethe University Frankfurt Neuropsychiatric Clinic. Along with Karl Leonhard, she was among Kleist's most prolific disciples and contributed significantly to popularizing the terms unipolar (‘einpolig’) and bipolar (‘zweipolig’) that are now used in the concepts of unipolar depression and bipolar disorder, and which had been coined by Kleist. Her 1949 Habilitation dissertation, a study of "cyclical psychoses" admitted to the Frankfurt University Neuropsychiatric Clinic between 1938 and 1942, was the first written publication which used the terms "unipolar disorder" and "bipolar disorder." She was the first woman to write a Habilitation in psychiatry in Germany. She later had a private practice as a psychiatrist in Frankfurt until she retired in 1986, aged 76.

During the national socialist era, she was, influenced by the theologian Karl Barth, a member of the Confessing Church, which actively opposed national socialism. She later became a member of the Christian Democratic Union (CDU) and served as Vice President of the CDU women's movement in Hesse in the 1960s. She was a personal friend of health minister Elisabeth Schwarzhaupt, Germany's first female member of the federal government. She was a CDU candidate in Hesse in the 1965 West German federal election.

The Edda Neele Foundation, founded in 1995, is named in her honour.
