= Karl Leonhard =

German psychiatrist (1904–1988)

Karl Leonhard (21 March 1904 – 23 April 1988) was a German psychiatrist who was a student and collaborator of Karl Kleist, who himself stood in the tradition of Carl Wernicke. With Kleist, he created a complex nosology of psychotic illnesses. His work covered psychology, psychotherapy, biological psychiatry and biological psychology. Moreover, he created a classification of nonverbal communication.

== Life ==
He was born at Edelsfeld in the Kingdom of Bavaria as the sixth of eleven children, his father being a Protestant minister. His medical education at the University of Erlangen, the Friedrich Wilhelm University of Berlin, and the Ludwig-Maximilians-Universität München was completed in 1928, and he worked as a physician at psychiatric hospitals in Erlangen, then a year later in Gabersee and from 1936 in Frankfurt, to which last he was called by Karl Kleist. During the period of the Third Reich in order to save his patients from being killed by means of the T-4 Euthanasia Program, he stopped making diagnoses that would endanger a patient.

He became a professor at the University of Frankfurt am Main in 1944 and a professor at the University of Erfurt in the Soviet zone of Germany in 1954. In 1957, he became director of the psychiatric department at the Charité Hospital linked to the Humboldt University of Berlin in East Berlin. He wanted to move back to West Germany in the 1960s, but was refused permission by the East German authorities. As compensation, he got increased support for his scientific work. During his lifetime he interviewed more than 2000 psychotic patients, latterly with Dr Sieglinde von Trostorff. He died in East Berlin in 1988.

According to Helmut Beckmann (see "Books" below), editors of Western journals rejected his papers because "they were not in conformity with the standard practice of Anglo-American psychiatry and also because he pursued without compromise his own path derived from his findings." Most of his work was not translated into English. However, summaries of Leonhard's views were included by Frank Fish in his "Schizophrenia" of 1962 (2nd edition 1976 ISBN 0-7236-0334-0) and "Clinical Psychopathology" of 1967 (2nd edition 1985 ISBN 0-7236-0605-6) which were widely read, if not understood, in their day.

Today diagnosis for psychotic patients and mentally or otherwise ill persons are most commonly placed by ICD or DSM criteria. Psychosis will in general appear as an affective disorder (e.g. psychotic depression), a psychotic disorder (e.g. catatonic type of schizophrenia) or a mixture of both types, as evident in the schizoaffective disorder.

== The Classification of Psychosis by Leonhard ==
Leonhard is well known for his classification of psychosis, based on the teamwork involving himself, his mentor Karl Kleist and fellow Kleist student Edda Neele. The classification is sometimes referred to as the Kleist-Leonhard classification system.

- Clinical Pictures of Phasic Psychoses (without Cycloid Psychoses)
  - Manic-Depressive Illness
  - Pure Melancholia and Pure Mania
    - Pure Melancholia
    - Pure Mania
  - Pure Depressions and Pure Euphorias
    - Pure Depressions
      - Agitated Depression
      - Hypochondriacal Depression
      - Self-Tortured Depression
      - Suspicious Depression
      - Apathetic Depression
    - Pure Euphorias
      - Unproductive Euphoria
      - Hypochondriacal Euphoria
      - Exalted Euphoria
      - Confabulatory Euphoria
      - Indifferent Euphoria
- The Cycloid Psychosis
  - Anxiety-Happiness Psychosis
  - Excited-Inhibited Confusion Psychosis
  - Hyperkinetic-Akinetic Motility Psychosis
- The Unsystematic Schizophrenias
  - Affective Paraphrenia
  - Cataphasia (Schizophasia)
  - Periodic Catatonia
- The Systematic Schizophrenias
  - Simple Systematic Schizophrenias
    - Catatonic Forms
      - Parakinetic Catatonia
      - Manneristic Catatonia
      - Proskinetic Catatonia
      - Negativistic Catatonia
      - Speech-Prompt Catatonia
      - Sluggish Catatonia
    - Hebephrenic Forms
      - Foolish Hebephrenia
      - Eccentric Hebephrenia
      - Shallow Hebephrenia
      - Autistic Hebephrenia
    - Paranoid Forms
      - Hypochondrical Paraphrenia
      - Phonemic Paraphrenia
      - Incoherrent Paraphrenia
      - Fantastic Paraphrenia
      - Confabulatory Paraphrenia
      - Expansive Paraphrenia
  - Combined Systematic Schizophrenias
    - Combined Systematic Catatonias
    - Combined Systematic Hebephrenias
    - Combined Systematic Paraphrenias
- Early Childhood Schizophrenias

== Books ==
- Die defektschizophrenen Krankheitsbilder, Leipzig: Thieme 1936
- Classification of Endogenous Psychoses and their Differentiated Etiology, 2nd edition edited by Helmut Beckmann. New York/Vienna: Springer-Verlag 1999 ISBN 3-211-83259-9
- Der menschliche Ausdruck in Mimik, Gestik und Phonik, Leipzig: Barth 1969 - 3. Aufl. Wuerzburg 1997.
