= Karl Kleist =

Karl Kleist

Karl Kleist (born 31 January 1879 in Mulhouse, Alsace, died 26 December 1960) was a German neurologist and psychiatrist who made notable advances in descriptive psychopathology and neuropsychology. Kleist coined the terms unipolar (‘einpolig’) and bipolar (‘zweipolig’) that are now used in the concepts of unipolar depression and bipolar disorder. His main publications were in the field of neurology, and he is particularly known for his work on the localisation of function in the cerebral cortex of man including mapping of cortical functions on brain maps. The work is based on several hundred cases of shot wounded patients of World War I, whose functional deficits Kleist deliberately studied and described in detail during their lifetime. Later on, by means of brain autopsy, he documented the lesion and was, thus, able to localize brain function in each single case doing this also on cytoarchitectonical grounds. Kleist was a student of Carl Wernicke and his work was closely associated with the Wernicke tradition. Among his students were Edda Neele and Karl Leonhard, who further developed the Kleist-Leonhard classification system of psychosis.

From 1920 to 1950, he was Professor of Neurology and Psychiatry and Director of the University Neuropsychiatric Clinic of the Goethe University Frankfurt. He oversaw the construction of the new Neuropsychiatric Clinic, which opened in 1931. Between 1950 and 1960, he was Director of the Research Institute for Brain Pathology and Psychopathology.

== Career ==
He studied medicine at the Universities of Strasbourg, Heidelberg, Berlin and Munich, and graduated as a medical doctor in 1902. He was employed as an assistant at the Neuropsychiatric Clinic, Halle University 1905–1908, thus working under Theodor Ziehen, Carl Wernicke and Gabriel Anton.

He worked for six months at Ludwig Edinger’s Neurological Institute in Frankfurt 1908–1909, and for six months in Alois Alzheimer’s laboratory in Munich. In 1909, he published his classic monograph on psychomotor disorders of movement in psychiatric patients.

He was Senior Physician at the Psychiatric Clinic, Erlangen University (directed by Specht), 1909–1914. Between 1914 and 1916, he served as a military physician in the Army Medical Service in a military hospital on the Western Front. From 1916 to 1920, he was Professor of Psychiatry at the University of Rostock. From 1920 to 1950, he was Professor of Neurology and Psychiatry at the Goethe University Frankfurt and Director of the University Neuropsychiatric Clinic. He also served as a consulting military psychiatrist (colonel) in military district IX in Frankfurt during WWII.

As Director of the Frankfurt University Neuropsychiatric Clinic, he reorganised and modernised the clinic, and oversaw the construction of the new University Neuropsychiatric Clinic built 1929 - 1931 by architects Ernst May und Martin Elsaesser. After retiring from this position in 1950 aged 71, he was Director of the Research Institute for Brain Pathology and Psychopathology 1950–1960, and continued to be active in research until his death at age 81.

Kleist was "instrumental in pioneering German neuropsychiatry and neuropsychology, including the description of frontal, constructional, limb-kinetic (innervatory) and psychomotor apraxias, frontal akinesia and aspontaneity, as well as object and form blindness." His Frankfurt School has been described as the last school of "completely unified neuropsychiatry," and many of his students became prominent researchers in the field.

During the national socialist era, Kleist balanced between loyalty to the state and criticism, and was "one of the few German physicians who continued to treat Jewish patients, to employ Jewish colleagues and to voice evident criticism of the policies of 'eugenics' and 'euthanasia'". Several staff members of his Neuropsychiatric Clinic were critical of national socialism, notably his students Neele and Leonhard, and they avoided using diagnoses, such as schizophrenia, that would endanger patients under the euthanasia program. In their publications from the era, Kleist and Leonhard attempted to redefine schizophrenia to minimize or avoid its use as a pretext for euthanasia. As director of the Frankfurt University Neuropsychiatric Clinic, his statutory duties also included the inspection of the mental asylums of Hesse-Nassau and the Rheingau. After the national socialists came into power, he was prevented from carrying out these duties for four years, until being allowed to perform an inspection in 1938 after offering his resignation. He was appalled by the conditions for the patients, including the doctor–patient ratio of 1:446, the poor food, unhygienic conditions, the lack of therapeutic activity, and the brutal language of the national socialists now in charge of the institutions, and voiced his objections "fearlessly." His objections were not well received by the Nazis, and he was banned from visiting any asylums for the remainder of the Nazi era.

== Research ==
Kleist studied both brain pathology and clinical Neurology and Psychiatry, which he regarded as closely allied fields. He rejected Kraepelin’s division of the functional psychoses into two divisions: dementia praecox (later renamed schizophrenia) and manic-depressive insanity, and attempted to isolate a large number of disease entities which he believed were due to focal brain lesions. This led to detailed description and analysis of neurological and psychiatric symptoms. He had many collaborators, among whom Karl Leonhard is notable for his genetic (at that time mainly family history) studies on groups of patients classified by Kleist. This line of work was carried on by Helmut Beckmann, co-founder of the International Wernicke-Kleist-Leonhard Society.

== Personal life ==
He grew up in Mulhouse in Alsace (now France) and was a son of the engineer and railway official in Mulhouse Heinrich Kleist (1833–1917) and Emilie née Spiess (1845–1933), who was a daughter of the Trier pastor Rudolf Spiess. In 1910, he married Luise Eyermann (1887–1974), daughter of the engineer and railway official Wilhelm Eyermann. They had four daughters.

== Honours ==
- Fellow of the Academy of Sciences Leopoldina
- Honorary senator of the University of Rostock (1949)
- Goethe Plaque of the City of Frankfurt (1954)
- Honorary doctor, University of Freiburg (1959)
- Honorary senator, University of Frankfurt (1959)
- Honorary Plaque of the City of Frankfurt (1959)

== Papers and books ==
1. K. Kleist, Die klinische Stellung der Motilitätspsychosen (Vortrag auf der Versammlung des Vereins bayerischer Psychiater, München, 6.-7-6-1911). Z. Gesamte Neurol. Psychiatr. Referate 3 (1911), pp. 914–977.
2. K. Kleist, Über zykloide Degenerationspsychosen, besonders Verwirrtheits- und Motilitätspsychosen. Arch. Psychiatry 78 (1926), pp. 100–115.
3. K. Kleist, Über zykloide, paranoide und epileptoide Psychosen und über die Frage der Degenerationspsychosen. Schweiz. Arch. Neurol. Psychiatr. 23 (1928), pp. 3–37.
4. Karl Kleist (1934). Gehirnpathologie. Leipzig: Barth.
5. Karl Kleist (1934). Kriegsverletzungen des Gehirns in ihrer Bedeutung für die Hirnlokalisation und Hirnpathologie. Leipzig: Barth.
6. Karl Kleist (1953). "Die Gliederung der neuropsychischen Erkrankungen". Monatsschrift für Psychiatrie und Neurologie. 125 (5–6): 526–554. doi:10.1159/000139931.
