= Clinical neurochemistry =

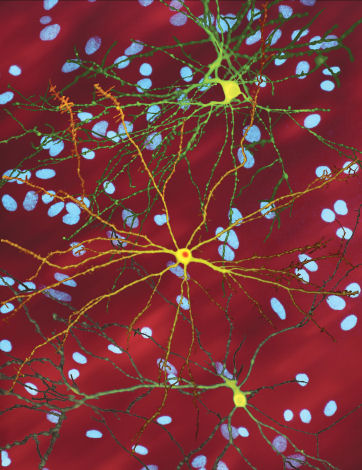
Progression of Huntington's Disease. A microscope image of Medium spiny neurons (yellow) with nuclear inclusions (orange), which occur as part of the disease process.

Clinical neurochemistry is the field of neurological biochemistry which relates biochemical phenomena to clinical symptomatic manifestations in humans. While neurochemistry is mostly associated with the effects of neurotransmitters and similarly functioning chemicals on neurons themselves, clinical neurochemistry relates these phenomena to system-wide symptoms. Clinical neurochemistry is related to neurogenesis, neuromodulation, neuroplasticity, neuroendocrinology, and neuroimmunology in the context of associating neurological findings at both lower and higher level organismal functions.

== Neuropharmacology and drug action ==
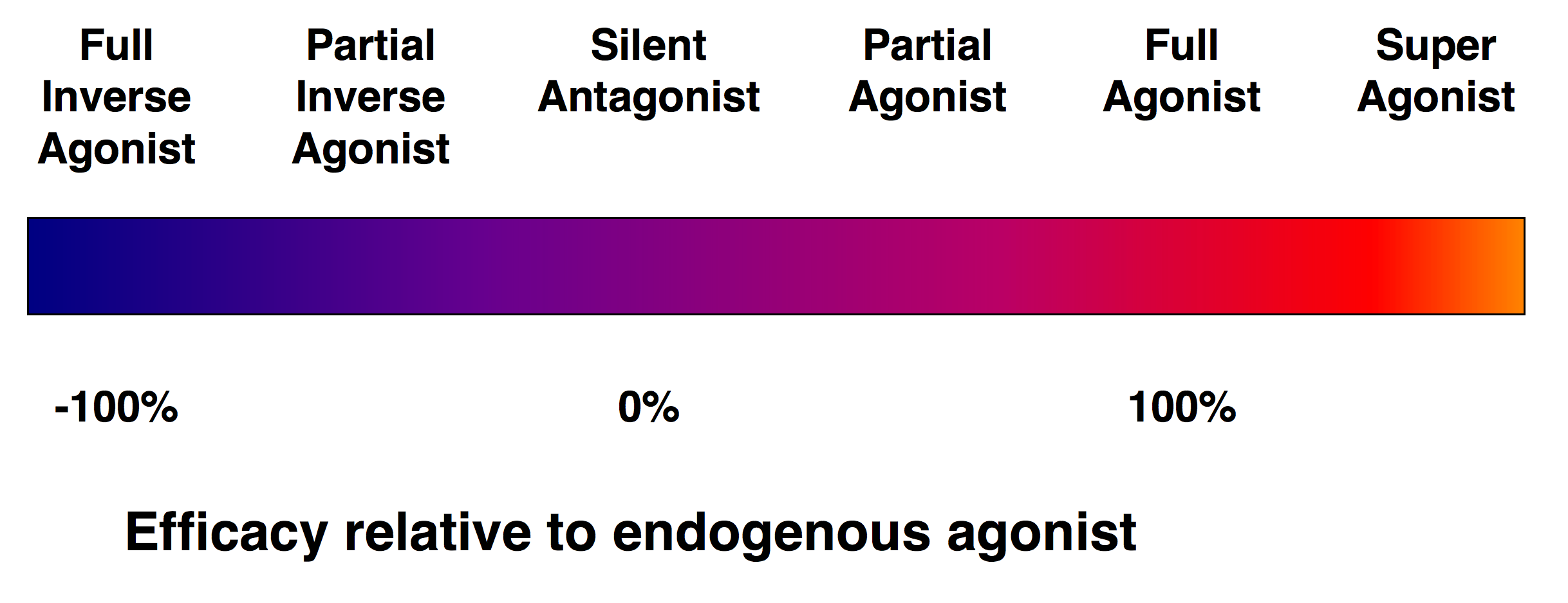
Efficacy spectrum of receptor ligands.

The integration of knowledge concerning the molecular and cellular actions of a drug within the brain circuitry leads to an overall understanding of a neurological drug's action mechanisms. This understanding of drug action in turn can be extrapolated to account for system-wide or clinical manifestations which are observed as symptoms. The clinical effects of a neural drug are due to both immediate changes in homeostasis and long-term neural adaptations characterized by the phenomena neural plasticity.

The most basic and fundamental neurological phenomena in neuropharmacology is the binding of a drug or neurologically active substance to a cellular target. One assay to determine the extent at which a ligand binds to its receptor is the radioligand binding assay (RBA), in which specific binding of a radioactively-labeled ligand is denoted by the difference between saturated and non-saturated tissue samples. While the RBA assay assumes that the tissue prepared has just one molecular target per ligand, in actuality this may not be the case. For example, serotonin binds to many diverse serotonin receptors which makes the RIA assay quite difficult to interpret. Because many receptors are essentially enzymes, the field of pharmakinetics utilizes the Michaelis–Menten equation to describe drug affinity (dissociation constant K_{d}) and total binding (B_{max}). Although K_{d} and B_{max} can be determined pictorially in a normal or logarithmic plot of ligand binding vs drug concentration, Scatchard plots allow for mathematical representation of several ligand binding sites, each with its own K_{d}.

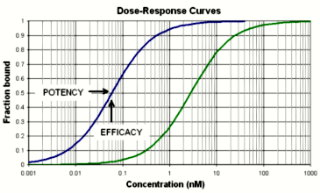
Semi-log plots of two agonists with different K_{d}.

Drug potency is the measure of binding strength between a drug and a specific molecular target, whereas drug efficacy describes the biological effect exerted by the drug itself, at either a cellular or organismal level. Because drugs range widely in their potency and efficacy, drugs have been categorized on the spectrum of agonists and antagonists. Agonists bind to receptors and elicit the same effects as an endogenous neurotransmitter. For example, morphine is an agonist of the opioid receptor family. Conversely, antagonists bind to a receptor and elicit no cellular change. Naloxone, an antagonist of the opioid receptors, exerts a biological effect only be interfering with endogenous neurotransmitter (morphine) binding. Inverse agonists bind to receptors and elicit the opposite effect that an agonist would. The spectrum of drug continuum also includes partial agonists and partial inverse agonists, which comprise the wide majority of neurological clinical treatments. The ultimate clinical effect of a drug can be analyzed with a dose-response curve.

== Neurologically active substances ==
There are many biologically active chemicals which elicit an effect on the nervous system. Neurotransmitters and similarly functioning biochemical messengers elicit effects on postsynaptic neurons at neuronal synapses. Excitatory Amino Acids include Glutamate, whereas inhibitory Amino Acids include GABA and Glycine. Additionally, catecholamines, serotonin, acetylcholine, histamine, and orexins have widely-projecting effects and are often referred to as neuromodulators. Neuropeptides include bradykinin, cholecystokinin, corticotropin-releasing factor (CRF), galanin, MCH, MSH, Neuropeptide Y (NPY), Neurotensin, Opioids, orexin, oxytocin, somatostatin, tachykinins, TRH, CUP, and vasopressin. Purines, endogenous cannabinoids, gasses, neurotrophic factors, chemokines, and VEGF are all classified as atypical neurotransmitters. Major receptors of neurotransmitters include AMPA receptors, NMDA receptors, and Kainate Receptors.

== Clinical neurological disorders ==
Changes in the homeostatic levels of many neurologically active chemicals elicit clinical disorders and symptoms.

=== Pain and inflammation ===
Nociception is the form of somatic sensation that detects potentially tissue-damaging noxious stimuli. Peripheral nociceptors uniquely express transient receptor potentials which are sensitive to potentially-damaging mechanical, chemical, or thermal stimuli. Nociceptors also contain receptors for pain and inflammatory-related mediators or cytokines. Peripheral nociceptors transmit noxious stimuli to the dorsal root ganglia, the dorsal horn, and further to the trigeminal ganglia in the brain. Pain has both a localizing somatic sensory component and an aversive emotional and motivational component. Pain travels through a variety of pathways via first pain on Alpha Delta fibers and second pain on slowly conducting C-fibers.

The dorsal horn of the spinal cord serves as a major integration center for both ascending nociceptive information and descending antinociceptive influences from the brain. Plasticity within the dorsal horn is mediated by NMDA glutamate receptors and key in the initiation of chronic pain by decreasing the excitability threshold in nociceptive pathways. Additionally, damage to neurons in nociceptive pathways leads to neuropathic pain. Three families in northern Pakistan were congenitally unable to perceive pain due to their homozygous loss of function mutation in the SCN9A gene which codes for the voltage-gated sodium channel Na_{V}1.7 . This key finding allowed pharmacologists to begin researching if the Na_{V}1.7 is a substantial molecular target for analgesic (antipain) medications.

Sensitization, in the clinical sense of the word, is a phenomenon in which nociceptors in an area beyond a tissue injury exhibit decreased thresholds for activation. Sensitization can be initiated by inflammatory prostaglandins or leukotrienes and are therefore the targets of nonsteroidal anti-inflammatory (NSAIDs) which block key enzymes in their synthesis. Additionally, opioid drugs suppress nociceptions by binding to endogenous opioid receptors.

=== Sleep and arousal ===
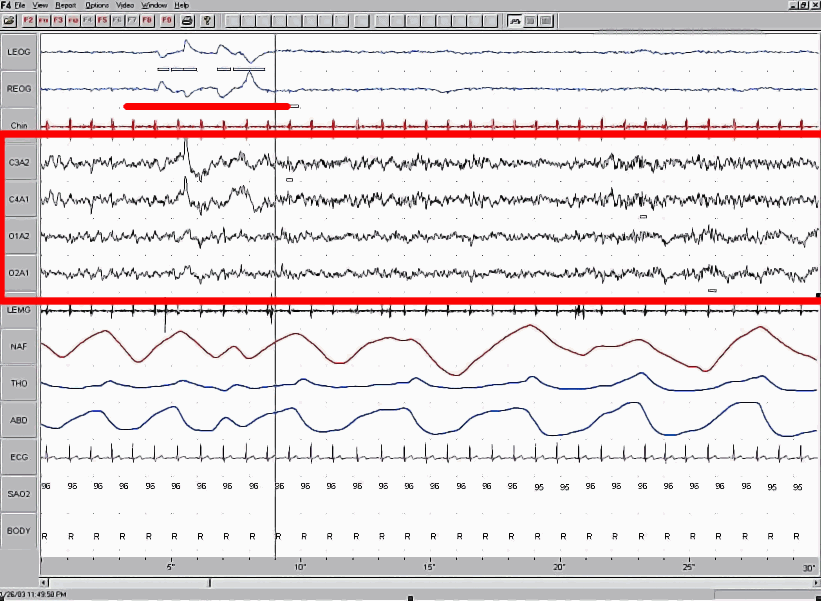
Polysomnographic record of REM Sleep. EEG highlighted by red box with eye movement highlighted by red line.

Sleep arousal are active brain processes medicated and associated with specific brain regions. Despite the fact that various stages of sleep are discrete and quantifiable, the exact function of sleep is unknown. Sleep is controlled both by circadian rhythms and the homeostatic drive produced by wakefulness. Circadian rhythms are produced in the suprachiasmatic nucleus by pacemaker cells which contain transcriptional regulation "clock genes" which have been highly conserved throughout evolution.

Non-REM sleep is initiated by neurons in the preoptic and anterior hypothalamic area, whereas REM sleep is eventually elicited by the cells in the pontine tegmentum. Electroencephalography is used to analyze brain wave patterns during sleep and has the capability to differentiate between REM sleep from non-REM sleep. REM sleep cycles mimic conscious brain patterns to an extent. Night Terrors, for example, involve the partial arousal out of non-REM sleep. Similarly, REM Behavior Disorder occurs when patients have fits of violent behavior during REM sleep. Benzodiazepines are the most common treatments for sleep-related disorders.

Dyssomnia is a class of sleep disorders which includes Primary insomnia, primary hypersomnia, narcolepsy, breathing-related sleep disorders, circadian rhythm sleep disorder, and other conditions. Primary insomnia is a disorder in which a patient has difficulty initiating and maintaining sleep. Behavior modification and a reduction in neurologically active substances such as caffeine and alcohol seem to be among the most promising treatments. Although the mechanism is unknown, brain plasticity and behavior modification are utilized to train patients to only go to bed when tired, associating the bed itself with a sleepy state.

Narcolepsy is a condition characterized by abnormal transitions between REM and non-REM cycles during sleep and the awake cycle. Cataplexy, on the other hand, is an involuntary loss of muscle tone during wakefulness. The mechanism of narcolepsy is unknown, though recent findings suggest that orexin neurons in the lateral and posterior hypothalamus may play a critical role in reinforcing wakefulness. Narcolepsy is often treated with psychostimulants or tricyclic antidepressants in order to suppress REM sleep patterns. Sleep apnea is a common breathing disorder during sleep and is related to a disability in the central respiratory drive mechanisms. Parasomnias are a class represented by nightmares, sleep terrors, night terrors, schizophrenia, certain mood disorders, and other conditions which arise during Stage 4 of sleep.

General anesthetics typically induce non-REM sleep characterized by amnesia, analgesia, immobility, and hypnosis by facilitating the inhibition of excitatory ion channels or the excitation of inhibitory ligand-gated channels.

=== Schizophrenia and other psychoses ===
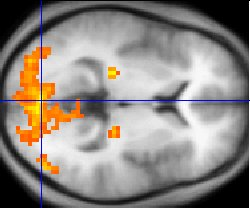
Functional magnetic resonance imaging depicting differences in brain activity among people diagnosed with schizophrenia

Schizophrenia is a psychological disorder in which a patient experiences symptoms including hallucinations, delusions, amotivation, social withdrawal, cognitive defects, and poor working memory. Heredity and gene inheritance is a highly important risk factor, especially for identical twins. Schizophrenia is anatomically characterized by a deterioration and loss of gray matter in the temporal and frontal regions of the cerebral cortex, though the exact mechanism is unknown. What is known is that the main two neurotransmitter systems implicated in schizophrenia are the dopamine and glutamate pathways.

Dopamine became a candidate for research when it was clinically noticed that antipsychotic drugs which are dopamine D_{2} receptor antagonists were noted to be quite successful in treating schizophrenia as well. Increased levels of dopamine in people with schizophrenia tend to induce paranoid delusions, ideas of reference, and auditory hallucinations. The same dopaminergic pathway is also involved in psychosis.

Glutamate has become a candidate for treatment focus because glutamate blocks some NMDA receptors which, on their own, induce schizophrenic behavior. In animal models, NMDA antagonists increase glutamate release in the prefrontal cortex. It is postulated that this is a homeostatic response to NMDA receptor blockade, which in turn increases psychotic symptoms. A class of NMDA receptor antagonists have been denoted dissociative anesthetics because they produce a sense of depersonalization and dissociation of subjective experience from various forms of sensory input stimuli. As such, variants such as Ketamine (Angel Dust/Special K) and Phencyclidine (PCP) have become a commonly abused street-drug. These drugs are no longer used due to harmful behavioral and addictive effects.

=== Neurodegeneration ===
Neurodegeneration is classified as a massive death of neurons, and encompasses diseases such as Alzheimer's, Parkinson's, and Huntington's. Although many cells die due to necrosis, many cells in neurodegenerative disorders are killed via the apoptotic pathway. Excitotoxicity, which involves overstimulation of a cell via its glutamate receptors, is one of the major processes which can initiate cell death. Other inducers include mitochondrial dysfunction, oxidative stress, and abnormal protein aggregation. Surprisingly, both necrotic and apoptotic processes utilize a similar intracellular signaling cascade which uses caspase proteins to induce cell death. Abnormal protein accumulation causes Alzheimer's, Parkinson's, and Huntington's diseases.

==== Alzheimer's disease ====
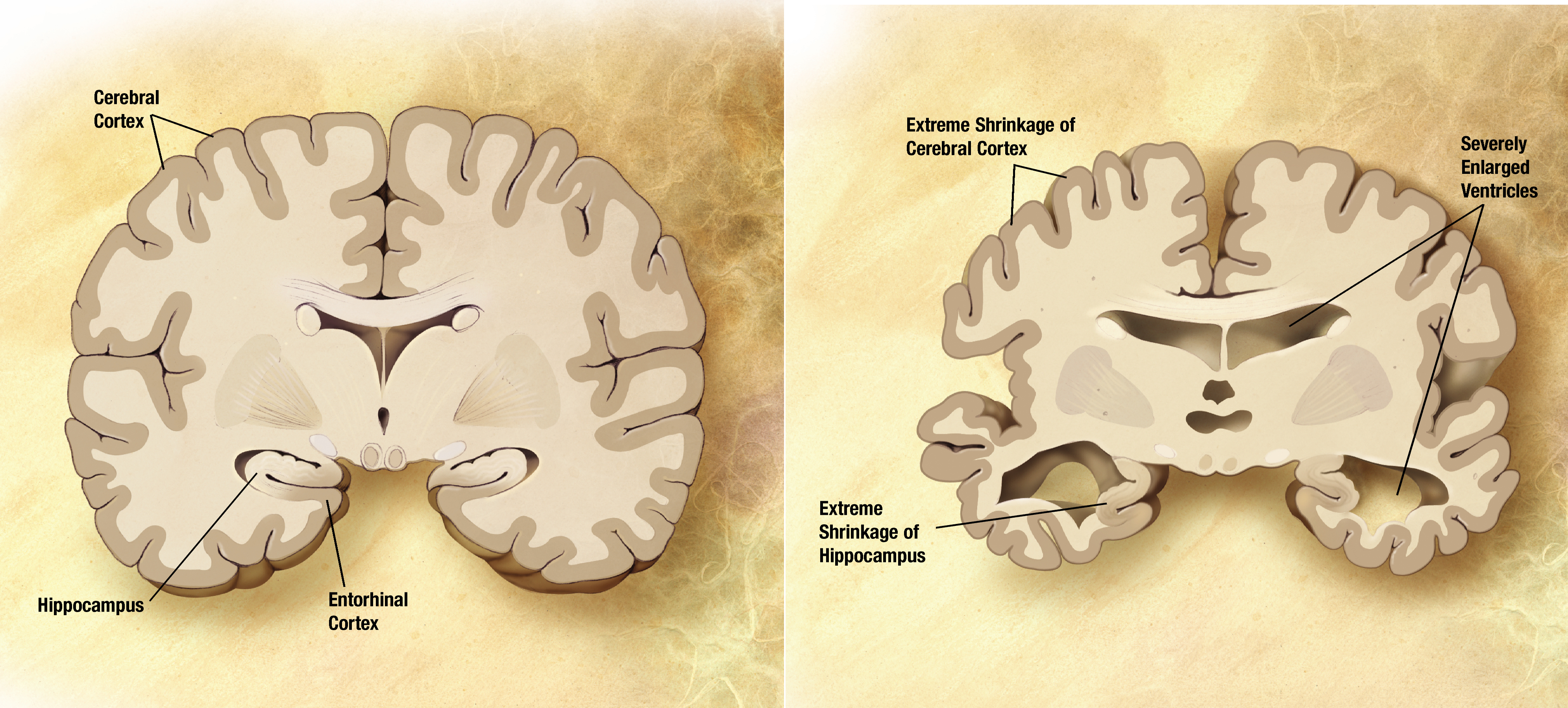
Comparison of a normal aged brain (left) and an Alzheimer's patient's brain (right).

Alzheimer's disease is the most common cause of severe memory impairment and is caused by senile plaques, neurofibrillary tangles, dystrophic neuritis, and neuronal loss. It is thought that Alzheimer's disease may be due to unnecessary protein accumulation of β Amyloid. In fact, Senile plaques are dense, protein deposits composed of amyloid β peptide. The two types of senile plaques are diffuse plaques and neuritic plaques, and differ in morphology. In addition to the amyloid, the microtubule-associated Tau protein has also been in involved with Alzheimer's disease and a variety of other neurodegenerative diseases. Inherited forms of Alzheimer's have been linked to mutation in the APP genes or presenilins which regulate APP processing. Because cholinergic neurons of the nucleus basalis are significantly altered during Alzheimer's progression, cholinergic agents such as choline and lecithin were hypothesized to augment the progression. However, these attempts were unsuccessful and the only clinically useful drugs used in the United States are cholinesterase inhibitors, which prolong the time before choline degradation. Although aNMDA receptor antagonists and anti-inflammatory drugs were tested in a clinical environment, more promising clinical trials are underway to targeting the Aβ with the immune system.

==== Parkinson's disease ====
Parkinson's disease is caused by the loss of dopamine stimulation to the basal ganglia of the midbrain, resulting in tremor at rest and bradykinesia. In some rare forms, protein aggregation of alpha-synuclein and parkin can elicit symptoms of Parkinson's disease. For a variety of drugs, restoring dopamine to the central nervous system remains the target therapy. Because dopamine cannot pass the blood brain barrier on its own, the dopamine precursor L-DOPA is used in its stead. However, synaptic plasticity renders this treatment decreasingly effective with time. Another treatment option is bromocriptine, which directly stimulates D_{2} Dopamine Receptors. Bromocriptine is less effective than L-Dopa in reducing symptoms, but provides less dyskinesia. Often, the two drugs are used in concert with one another. New approaches to treatment include deep brain simulation and cell transplantation with stem cells. Deep brain stimulation offsets symptoms rather than cures, and stem cell studies have been extremely disappointing, despite relative success with animal models. Gene therapy may provide a novel route to introduce new dopamine production via viral-medicated gene transfection, but clinical trials are yet to be completed.

==== Huntington's disease ====
Huntington's disease is a disease characterized by minor coordination problems, jerking eye movements, and uncontrollable movement of peripheral limbs. Symptoms generally occur at the age of 40, and are often accompanied by depression and psychosis. The disease is caused by a mutation in the Huntingtin gene, on chromosome 4, which causes abnormally large numbers of glutamate residues in the protein. Via an unknown mechanism, this accumulation leads to neurodegeneration in the caudate nucleus and putamen, selectively destroying GABAergic neurons which project to the globus pallidus. There is also significant necrosis in the thalamus and cerebral cortex. Cholinergic interneurons and dopaminergic neurons in the midbrain are largely unaffected. Treatment for Huntington's disease is extremely limited due to the lack of knowledge concerning the pathogenesis of protein accumulation, though drugs used include dopamine receptor antagonists to minimize tremors and antidepressants to ameliorate symptoms of psychosis and depression.

== See also ==
- Neurology
- Neurochemistry
- Neurotransmitter
- Chemical synapse
