= Frank Fish =

British psychiatrist

Frank Fish MBBS MRCP MRCPE DPM
- Scientific career
- Fields: Psychiatry
- Institutions: Universities of Edinburgh & Liverpool

Frank James Fish (26 May 1917 – 13 June 1968) was the first professor of psychiatry at the University of Liverpool, and prior to that a senior lecturer in psychiatry at the University of Edinburgh. His publications helped bring the German tradition of descriptive psychopathology to the attention of English-speaking psychiatrists.

== Early life ==
He passed the London General School Examination in 1933 and in 1935 obtained the science qualification necessary for him to enrol at the London Hospital Medical College that October. He qualified with the Conjoint diploma (LRCP London, MRCS England) in 1939.

After resident posts in medicine and surgery he joined the Royal Army Medical Corps and served during the Second World War in North Africa, where he was taken prisoner at the fall of Tobruk.

In 1943, he managed to escape from captivity in Italy and after what his BMJ obituarist calls "a period of considerable hardship and excitement" he reached the allied lines. He was demobilised in 1946 with the rank of captain.

== Postgraduate training ==
He passed the University of London's examinations for the degrees of Bachelor of Medicine and Bachelor of Surgery (MB BS) in 1946 and in 1948 those for Membership of the Royal College of Physicians of London (MRCP) Having taken up psychiatry in 1951, he obtained a Diploma in Psychological Medicine (DPM) in 1952.

He was a trainee in the university department in Newcastle-upon-Tyne before moving to the professorial unit of the Maudsley Hospital in London where he came under the influence of Sir Aubrey Lewis. Taking an interest in the continental schools of psychiatry, he worked with Karl Leonhard in East Germany and Christian Astrup in Norway. Fish was appointed assistant psychiatrist at the Carlton Hayes Hospital, Narborough, in 1954 and consultant psychiatrist at St. Nicholas Hospital, Gosforth, in 1955.

== Academic Work ==
Fish moved to the University of Edinburgh as a senior lecturer in psychological medicine in 1956, and became a member of the Royal College of Physicians there (MRCPE) in 1964. That year he became the first professor of psychiatry at the University of Liverpool.

He set up professorial units of psychiatry at Rainhill Hospital and Walton Hospital, Liverpool. Apart from undergraduate and postgraduate teaching and research, and writing several textbooks, his main contribution has been to bring German descriptive psychopathology to the attention of English-speaking psychiatrists, in particular the works of Carl Wernicke, Karl Kleist and Karl Leonhard, which stand apart from the Anglo-American tradition dominated earlier by psychoanalysis and now by the Diagnostic and Statistical Manual of the American Psychiatric Association. This serves to balance the earlier uncritical acceptance of psychoanalytic theory. His Clinical Psychopathology: Signs and Symptoms in Psychiatry became a classic for postgraduate students.

Despite championing Wernicke, Kleist and Leonhard, Fish wrote that Emil Kraepelin was "probably the most outstanding psychiatrist who ever lived." However, he said the general orientation of his "Outline of Psychiatry" was "neo-Meyerian:" i.e., "that in any given case, all the factors which may possibly be relevant should be considered and the appropriate measures, based on empirical knowledge, psychoanalytic theory, sociology, or common sense, should be applied."

== Publications ==
- Schizophrenia Bristol: John Wright (1962)
- Fish's Schizophrenia (2nd ed by Max Hamilton) Bristol: John Wright (1976) ISBN 978-0-72360334-4
- An Outline of Psychiatry Bristol: John Wright (1964)
- Fish's Outline of Psychiatry (4th ed by Max Hamilton) (1984) ISBN 978-0-72360797-7
- Clinical Psychiatry for the Layman Bristol: John Wright (1963) ISBN 978-0-72360095-4
- Clinical Psychopathology Bristol: John Wright (1967)
- Fish's Clinical Psychopathology (2nd ed by Max Hamilton) Bristol: John Wright (1985) ISBN 0-7236-0605-6
- Fish's Clinical Psychopathology (3rd ed by Patricia Casey & Brendan Kelly) London: Gaskell (2007) ISBN 978-1-904671-32-9
- Fish's Clinical Psychopathology (4th ed by Casey & Kelly) Cambridge Uni Press: 2019 ISBN 978-1-10845634-0
