= Helmut Beckmann =

German psychiatrist

Helmut Beckmann (22 May 1940 – 3 September 2006) was a German psychiatrist. He was one of the founders of neurodevelopmental theory of schizophrenia and biologically-based psychiatry in Germany.

Beckmann's major scientific interests were psychopharmacology, neuropathology of endogenous psychoses, and differentiated psychopathology, in the tradition of Carl Wernicke, Karl Kleist and Karl Leonhard.

He continuously insisted and claimed that psychoses with schizophrenic and schizophrenia-like symptoms did not appear to be a continuum of disorders, but seemed rather to consist of different, clinically sharply distinguished subgroups with different genetic, somatic and psychosocial origins.

== Professional engagement ==
In 1979, Helmut Beckmann was a Constitutional Committee Member of the German Society of Biological Psychiatry, became President in 1987–1990, and was an Honorary Fellow from 2000. He served as treasurer of the World Federation of Societies of Biological Psychiatry (WFSBP) from 1991 to 1997, and as President of Collegium Internationale Neuro-Psychopharmacologicum (CINP) from 1998 to 2000.

In 1989, he was co-founder of the International Wernicke-Kleist-Leonhard Society (WKL), appointed as president and confirmed in this position until his death.

Helmut Beckmann's publications include more than 350 papers, books and new editions of Leonhard's textbooks.

He received the Kurt Schneider Prize for his twin studies together with E. Franzek.

He served on the Editorial Board of many psychiatric journals, including Psychopathology, Journal of Neural Transmission, Biological Psychiatry, and World Journal of Biological Psychiatry.

== Clinical work and contribution to psychodiagnostics and psychopathology ==
Helmut Beckmann trained a generation of psychiatrists in evidence-based treatment and psychopathology, and thus promoted a generation of academics, many of whom are leaders in the field today.

Helmut Beckmann became acquainted with Karl Leonhard's work through his doctoral advisor H. Dietrich at LMU Munich very early in his professional career.

Early in his academic career, he thus came to the conclusion that one of the reasons for the lack of progress in psychiatric research could be – although worked out with good intention – the anosological diagnostic methodology carried out through expert consensus. On his appointment to the University of Würzburg, he invited Karl Leonhard for lectures and visited him several times in the former Eastern part of Germany absorbing his outstanding knowledge on endogenous psychoses.

Inspired by him, he contrasted the anosological approach with a classification of the endogenous psychoses based on a clinical-empirical approach derived from lifelong observations of the patients in highly differentiated descriptions.

He insisted that a certain diagnosis can be provided only when all the characteristic symptoms of a clinical picture are clearly present.

== Re-classification of psychoses and environmental factors in the cause of schizophrenia ==
Helmut Beckmann proposed to go back on the painstaking road of psychopathological differentiation in order to obtain the most homogeneous groups for investigation, thus enabling sophisticated modern biomedical techniques to bring more certainty to the field.

In a series of reports, he and his co-workers pinpointed the nosological autonomy of cycloid psychoses, unsystematic and systematic schizophrenias by inter-rater reliability analysis and long-term follow-up studies.

He emphasized that the phenomenon of birth seasonality is confined to an excess of winter and spring births in cycloid psychoses and systematic schizophrenias (both groups with low familial loading of psychosis).

Subsequent studies on maternal recall of gestational infections documented a direct relationship between flu-like and febrile affections in the first trimester of maternal gestation with the later occurrence of cycloid psychoses and second trimester affections with manifestations of systematic schizophrenias.

The autonomy of the cycloid psychoses was substantiated by neurophysiological and morphometric studies. In a systematic twin study, he provided evidence that in cycloid psychosis monozygotic pairs had similar concordance rates to dizygotic pairs, pointing to a low heritability. These findings were confirmed by a controlled family study, where first-degree relatives of patients with cycloid psychoses were found to show a similar low frequency of secondary cases to relatives of a population-based control sample.

== Neurodevelopmental theory of schizophrenia ==
Driven by his pioneering neuropathological findings of early prenatal cytoarchitectural malformations in the brains of patients with schizophrenic psychoses, he is one of the fathers of the neurodevelopmental theory of these psychoses.

In 1986 with C. Jakob, he reported on cortical and subcortical developmental disturbances in schizophrenic psychoses, particularly in the entorhinal area.

These cytoarchitectural abnormalities were mainly or exclusively localized in the upper cortical layers of the limbic allocortex, including circumscribed malformations, nerve cell alterations as well as cytoarchitectural deviations attributable to disruptions of neural migration in the second trimester of gestation.

== Psychomotor psychoses ==
Clinically, his major affinity was to the psychomotor psychoses. His examinations were based on the profound knowledge of his predecessors, and he taught us to meticulously observe the clinical pictures.

This resulted in profound progress towards an etiological differentiation of the catatonic psychoses, which finally demonstrated a confirmed and significant linkage of periodic catatonia to chromosome 15q15, despite considerable genetic heterogeneity.

In the light of these findings, the spectrum of psychoses with schizophrenic and schizophrenia-like symptoms did not appear to be a continuum of disorders, but seemed rather to consist of different, clinically sharply distinguished subgroups with different genetic, somatic and psychosocial origins.

Although his findings were not readily accepted, he always hoped that reservations about a nosological differentiation of endogenous psychoses would one day give way to a fruitful discussion of its findings and implications.

In Helmut Beckmann, the psychiatric community loses a person who translated brilliant ideas into practical research to advance scientific and clinical knowledge on the etiology of mental disorders and treatment of patients with mental disorders.

== Education and work ==
After the study of medicine at the University of Cologne, Heinrich Heine University Düsseldorf, Heidelberg University, and LMU Munich, he trained in psychiatry at the Psychiatric District Hospital of Haar near Munich and moved to the Department of Psychiatry at LMU Munich, as research assistant in 1971.

Under the aegis of H. Hippius and N. Matussek, he was involved in clinical and biochemical studies in the emerging field of psychopharmacology, including a research fellowship at F.K. Goodwin's group at the National Institute of Mental Health (NIMH), Bethesda, MD, USA.

In 1978, he received an appointment as university lecturer in ‘Clinical Psychiatry’ at LMU Munich [‘Habilitation’]. In the same year, he moved to the Central Institute of Mental Health, Mannheim (Head H. Häfner), where he was appointed Professor at the Faculty of Medicine of Heidelberg University in 1978 and Vice-Director in 1983.

Two years later, in 1985, he became head of the Department of Psychiatry and Psychotherapy at the University of Würzburg, a position he held until his retirement in May 2006.

== Bibliography ==
1. Beckmann H (ed): Editor's comment; in Leonhard K (ed): Classification of Endogenous Psychoses and Their Differentiated Etiology, 2nd rev enlarged ed. Vienna, Springer, 1999, pp v–xiv.
2. Beckmann H: Neuropathology of the endogenous psychoses; in Henn F, Sartorius N, Helmchen H, Lauter H (eds): Contemporary Psychiatry. Berlin, Springer, 2001, vol 3, pp 81–100.
3. Franzek E, Beckmann H: Season-of-birth effect reveals the existence of etiologically different groups of schizophrenia. Biol Psychiatry 1992; 32:375–378.
4. Franzek E, Beckmann H: Different genetic background of schizophrenia spectrum psychoses: a twin study. Am J Psychiatry 1998;155: 76–83.
5. Jakob H, Beckmann H: Prenatal development disturbances in the limbic allocortex in schizophrenia. J Neural Transm 1986;65:303–326.
6. Stöber G, Saar K, Rüschendorf F, Meyer J, Nürnberg G, Jatzke S, Franzek E, Reis A, Lesch KP, Wienker TF, Beckmann H: Splitting schizophrenia: periodic catatonia-susceptibility locus on chromosome 15q15. Am J Hum Genet 2000;67:1201–1207.
