= CNS Neuroscience & Therapeutics =

- Discipline: Neurology
- Language: English
- Edited by: Mark H. Pollack, Roger Bullock

Publication details
- Former name(s): CNS Drug Reviews
- History: 1995–present
- Publisher: Wiley-Blackwell
- Frequency: Bimonthly
- Impact factor: 7.035 (2021)

Standard abbreviations
- ISO 4: CNS Neurosci. Ther.

Indexing
- ISSN: 1755-5930 (print); 1755-5949 (web)
- LCCN: 2008243471
- OCLC no.: 221972947

Links
- Journal homepage; Online access; Online aechive

CNS Neuroscience & Therapeutics is a bimonthly peer-reviewed medical journal established in 1995 as CNS Drug Reviews and obtained its current title in 2008. It is published by Wiley-Blackwell and addresses topics in neurology and central nervous system therapeutic pharmacology.
