= Translational neuroscience =

Translational neuroscience is the field of study which applies neuroscience research to translate or develop into clinical applications and novel therapies for nervous system disorders. The field encompasses areas such as deep brain stimulation, brain machine interfaces, neurorehabilitation and the development of devices for the sensory nervous system such as the use of auditory implants, retinal implants, and electronic skins.

== Classification ==
Translational neuroscience research is categorized into stages of research, which are classified using a five tier system (T0-T4), beginning with basic science research and ending with the public health applications of basic scientific discoveries. While once considered a linear progression from basic science to public health application, translational research, and translational neuroscience in particular, is now regarded as a cyclic, where public health needs inform basic science research, which then works to discover the mechanisms of public health issues and works towards clinical and public health implementation.

The stages of translational neuroscience research are as follows:

- T0: Basic science research
- T1: Preclinical research
- T2: Clinical research or Clinical neuroscience
- T3: Clinical implementation
- T4: Public health

== Methods ==
=== Electrophysiology ===
Electrophysiology is used within translational neuroscience as a means of studying the electric properties of neurons in animal models as well as to investigate the properties of human neurological dysfunction. Techniques used in animal models, such as patch-clamp recordings, have been used to investigate how neurons respond to pharmacological agents. Electroencephalography (EEG) and magnetoencephalography (MEG) are both used to measure electrical activity in the human brain, and can be used in clinical settings to localize the source of neurological dysfunction in conditions such as epilepsy, and can also be used in a research setting to investigate the differences in electrical activity in the brain between normal and neurologically dysfunctional individuals.

=== Neuroimaging ===
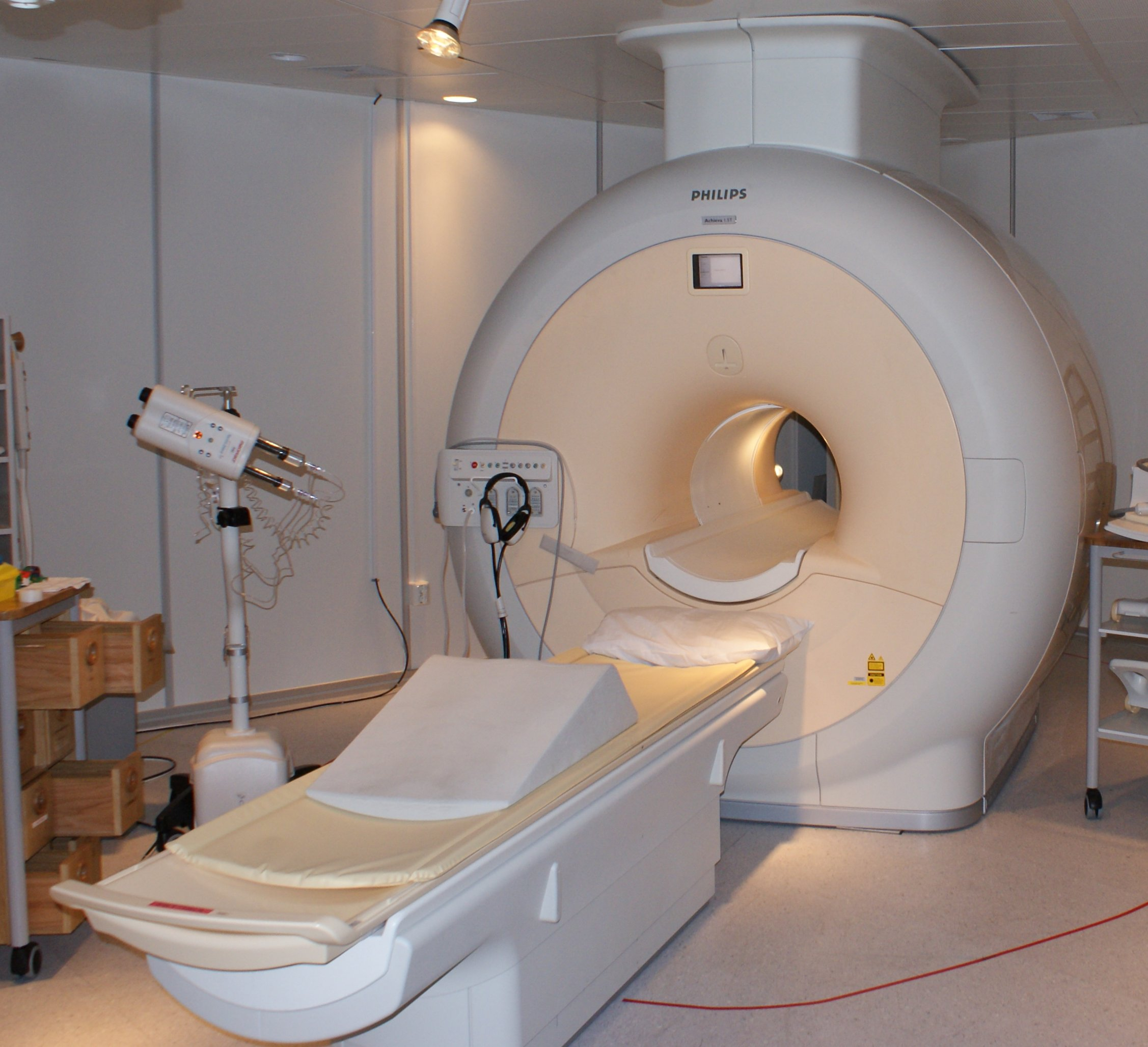
An fMRI scanner.

Neuroimaging comprises a variety of techniques used to observe the activity or the structures of, or within, the nervous system. Positron emission tomography (PET) has been used in animal models, such as non-human primate and rodent, to identify and target molecular mechanisms of neurological disease, and to study the neurological impact of pharmacological drug addiction. Similarly, functional magnetic resonance imaging (fMRI) has been used to investigate the neurological mechanisms of pharmacological drug addiction, the neurological mechanisms of mood and anxiety disorders in elderly populations, and the neurological mechanisms of disorders such as schizophrenia.

=== Gene therapy ===
Gene therapy is the delivery of nucleic acid as a treatment for a disorder. In translational neuroscience, gene therapy is the delivery of nucleic acid as a treatment for a neurological disorder. Gene therapy has been proven effective at treating a variety of disorders, including neurodegenerative disorders such as Parkinson's disease (PD) and Alzheimer's disease (AD), in rodent and non-human primate models, and in humans, via the application of neurotrophic factors, such as nerve growth factor (NGF), brain-derived neurotrophic factor (BDNF), and glial cell line-derived neurotrophic factor (GDNF), and via the application of enzymes such as glutamic acid decarboxylase (GAD), which commonly use adeno-associated viruses (AAV) as a vector.

=== Stem cells ===
Stem cells, particularly induced pluripotent stem cells (iPSCs), are utilized in translational neuroscience research as not only a treatment for nervous system disorders, but also as the source for models of neural dysfunction. For example, due to the central nervous system's limited regenerative abilities, human embryonic stem cells (hESCs), a type of pluripotent stem cell, has been used as a replacement for damaged neurons, a novel approach that involves the surgical transplantation of fetal stem cells

== Applications ==
=== Neurodevelopmental disorders ===
Neurodevelopmental disorders are characterized as disorders where the development of the nervous system was disrupted, and encompasses disorders such as learning disabilities, autism spectrum disorders (ASD), epilepsy, and certain neuromuscular disorders. Translational neuroscience research involves efforts to uncover the molecular mechanisms for these disorders and work towards cures in patient populations. Additionally, translational neuroscience research has focused on elucidating the cause of neurodevelopmental disorders, whether it be genetic, environmental, or a combination of both, as well as tactics for prevention, if possible.

=== Neurodegenerative disorders ===
Neurodegenerative disorders are a result of neuronal loss of function over time which lead to cell death. Examples of neurodegenerative disorders include Alzheimer's disease, Parkinson's disease, and Huntington's disease. The focus of translational neuroscience research is to investigate the molecular mechanisms for these disorders, and to investigate the mechanisms of drug delivery to treat these disorders, including an investigation into the impact of the blood-brain barrier on drug delivery, and the role of the body's immune system in neurodegenerative disorders.

== See also ==
- Translational medicine
- Knowledge transfer
