= Havana syndrome =

Symptoms reported by US and Canadian officials abroad

- Other names: Anomalous health incidents Unexplained health incidents Unidentified health incidents
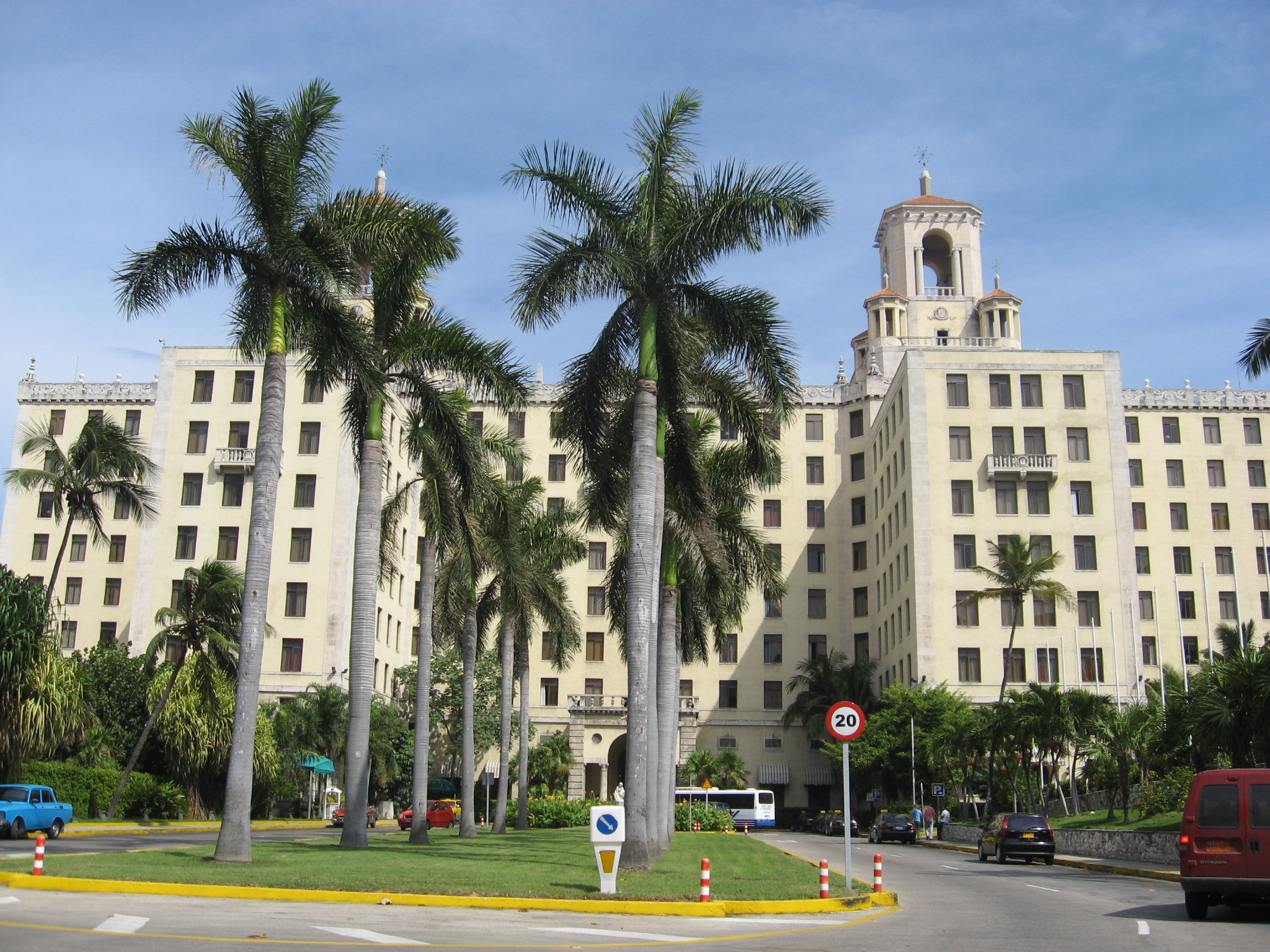
- The Hotel Nacional in Havana is one of the locations where the syndrome was reported.
- Causes: Not determined Mass psychogenic illness (proposed)
- Named after: Havana, Cuba

Havana syndrome, also known as anomalous health incidents (AHIs), is a disputed medical condition. Starting in 2016 in about a dozen overseas locations, U.S. and Canadian government officials and their families reported symptoms associated with a perceived localized loud sound. The symptoms lasted for months and included disabling cognitive problems, balance problems, dizziness, insomnia, and headaches. Havana syndrome is not recognized as a disease by the medical community.

A number of government and non-government agencies have conducted investigations into the AHIs, including the State Department (2018), University of Pennsylvania (2018), FBI's Behavioral Analysis Unit (2018), JASON (2018 and 2022), Centers for Disease Control (2019), Department of Defense (2020), Central Intelligence Agency (CIA) (2020), National Academies of Sciences, Engineering, and Medicine (NASEM) (2020), Cuban Academy of Sciences (2021), seven intelligence agencies under the auspices of the Office of the Director of National Intelligence (ODNI) (2023), and National Institutes of Health (NIH) (2024). Several news organizations have also conducted investigations.

Official investigations have provided various theories on the cause of AHI, but there is no consensus. Theories include directed-energy weapons, psychological and social causes, and toxic chemicals. However, no cause has been established.

The U.S. government has established a variety of programs providing medical and financial support to people that reported AHI symptoms, but some AHI patients continue to campaign for additional support.

== Syndrome ==
A variety of symptoms are associated with Havana Syndrome, including dizziness, headaches, pain, and cognitive problems. Havana syndrome is not a disease recognized by the International Classification of Diseases diagnostic manual.

=== Signs and symptoms ===
Most of the affected individuals reported an acute onset of neurological symptoms associated with a perceived localized loud sound such as screeching, chirping, clicking, or piercing noises. Two-thirds reported visual disturbances such as blurred vision and sensitivity to light. More than half reported intense pressure or vibration in the head, ear pain, diffuse head pain, and cognitive problems such as forgetfulness and poor concentration. Tinnitus and hearing loss occurred in one-third of cases, and dizziness or unsteady gait affected one-quarter.

Some affected individuals reported chronic symptoms that last for months, such as balance and cognitive problems, insomnia, and headaches. The longevity of these symptoms is not clear, and they are less specific than the acute symptoms.

=== Causes ===
A review article written in 2022 by Ali A. Asadi-Pooya considered several possible causes. It stated that a plausible explanation was the use of a directed-energy or radio frequency weapon, with other possible causes including functional disorders, psychogenic disease, or exposure to chemicals/neurotoxins. The authors cautioned that all studies included in their review were limited by small sample sizes, and that the underlying cause remains unidentified.

A 2023 review article written by Bartholomew and Baloh concluded that Havana syndrome was erroneously classified as a novel entity due to a moral panic based on the fear of foreign entities such as the Russians or Cubans attacking the U.S., the over-interpretation of data, misconceptions about psychogenic illness, and coverage and leaks by the media. The authors stated that the U.S. intelligence community had concluded that Havana syndrome is "a socially constructed catch-all category for an array of pre-existing health conditions, responses to environmental factors, and stress reactions that were lumped under a single label".

A 2024 review article by Connolly et al., surveying multiple peer-reviewed studies, concluded that the cause of AHIs is still unknown. The review discussed several possible causes, including mass psychogenic illness and head trauma, but did not endorse a specific cause.

=== Number of people ===
There are no official statistics, but media reporting indicated a total of 26 people around 2017, 40 in 2019 (U.S. and Canadian), 130 people in May 2021, more than 200 by September 2021, and more than 1,000 by early 2022. The cases affected CIA, U.S. military, and State Department personnel and their family members. Some reports, after investigation, were determined to have ordinary explanations.

In July 2024, a report from the GAO stated that 334 people had completed the process to qualify for care in the military health system.

== Locations ==
People have reported experiencing AHIs in about a dozen countries, and in a variety of circumstances, including in hotels, at home, while in vehicles, and while walking a dog in the suburbs.

=== Cuba ===
==== U.S. personnel ====
In August 2017, reports began surfacing that American and Canadian diplomatic personnel in Cuba had experienced unusual, unexplained health problems dating to late 2016. As of June 2018, the number of American citizens experiencing symptoms was 26.

The original 21 events in Cuba were characterized as starting with strange grating noises coming from a specific direction. Some people reported pressure, vibration, or a sensation comparable to driving a car with the window partly rolled down. These noises lasted from 20 seconds to 30 minutes and happened while the diplomats were either at home or in hotel rooms. Other people nearby (including family members and guests in neighboring rooms) did not experience the same symptoms.

In 2017, the U.S. State Department concluded that the health problems were either the result of an attack or due to exposure to an unknown device, but that it was not blaming the Cuban government, and would not say who was to blame. Speculation centered around a sonic weapon, with some researchers pointing to infrasound as a possible cause. Affected people described symptoms such as hearing loss, memory loss, and nausea. Some U.S. embassy workers report lasting health problems.

In August 2017, the United States expelled two Cuban diplomats in retaliation for perceived Cuban responsibility. The next month, the U.S. State Department stated that it was removing non-essential staff from the U.S. embassy and warned U.S. citizens not to travel to Cuba. In October 2017, President Donald Trump said he believed that Cuba was responsible for the occurrences, calling them a "very unusual attack".

In response to the incidents, the U.S. State Department announced in March 2018 that it would continue to staff its embassy in Havana at the minimum level required to perform core diplomatic and consular functions; the embassy had been operating under "ordered departure status" since September 2017, but the status was set to expire. This announcement extended the staff reductions indefinitely.

==== Canadian personnel ====
In March 2018, some Canadian diplomats traveled to Pittsburgh to consult the neurologist that had previously diagnosed brain issues in US diplomats. The neurologist concluded that MRIs of the Canadians showed evidence of brain damage that was similar to what the neurologist reported for the American counterparts. In early 2018, Global Affairs Canada ended family postings to Cuba and withdrew all staff with families. Several of the Canadians who were affected in 2017 were reported to still be unable to resume their work due to the severity of their ailments. The lack of knowledge of the cause of Havana syndrome, as of February 2019, had made it challenging for the Royal Canadian Mounted Police to investigate. In 2019, the Canadian government announced that it was reducing its embassy staff in Havana after a 14th Canadian diplomat reported symptoms of Havana syndrome in late December 2018.

=== Beyond Cuba ===
Beginning in late 2017, suspected attacks targeting U.S. intelligence personnel were reported in an expanding set of locations around the world, including Moscow, Russia; Tbilisi, Georgia; Poland; Taiwan; and Australia. Other reports came from Colombia, Kyrgyzstan, Uzbekistan, and Austria, among other countries. The Russian embassy in Australia dismissed reports of Russian operatives targeting CIA personnel in Australia.

==== China ====
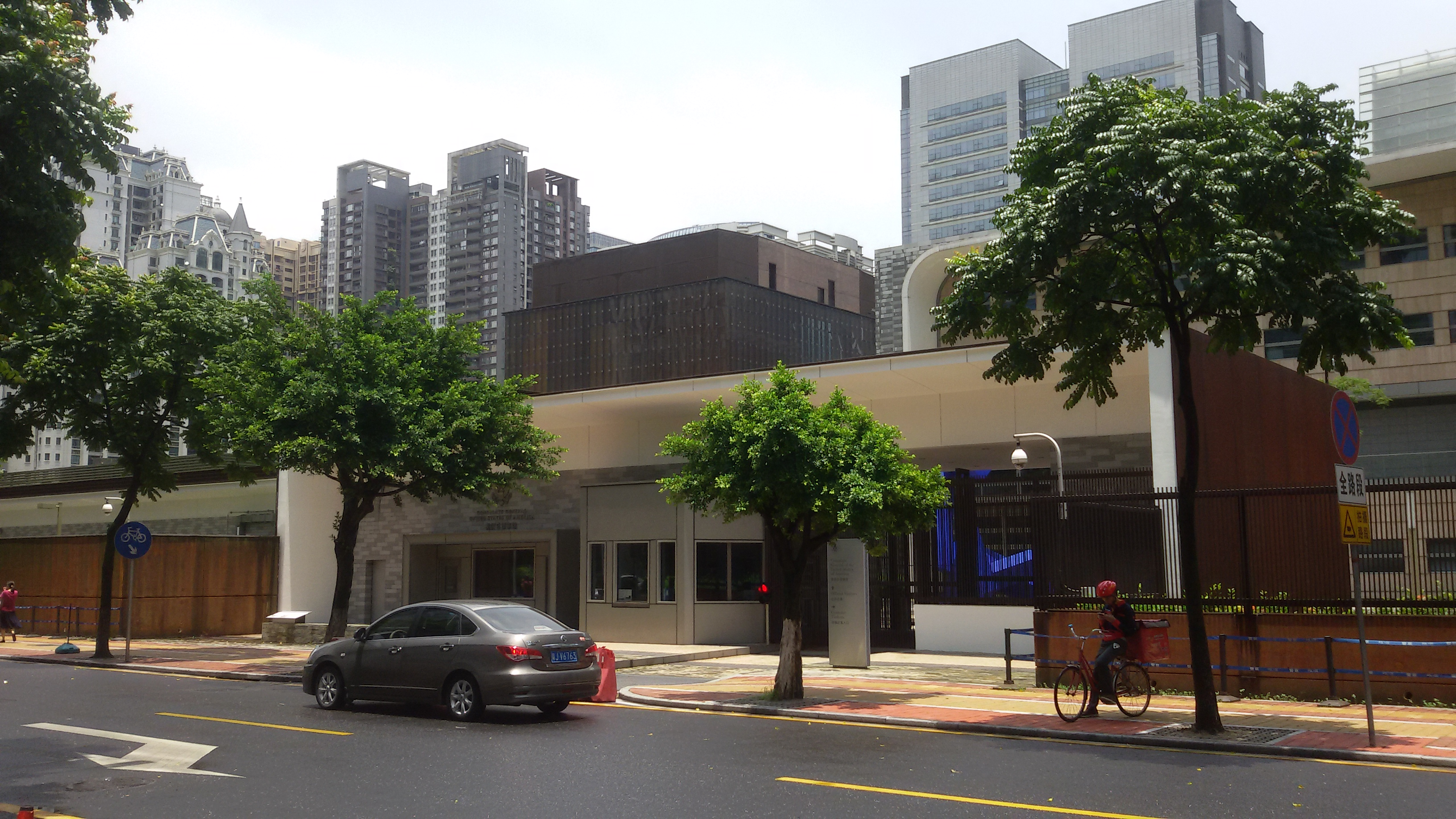
Consulate General of the United States in Guangzhou

Starting in early 2018, U.S. diplomats in China began reporting symptoms consistent with Havana syndrome. The first such incident was reported by an American diplomat in China in April 2018 at the Guangzhou consulate, the largest U.S. consulate in China. The employee reported that he had been experiencing symptoms since late 2017. Several individuals were taken to the U.S. for medical examination.

Answering questions from the House Foreign Affairs Committee in May 2018, Secretary of State Mike Pompeo testified that U.S. diplomatic staff in Guangzhou had reported symptoms "very similar" to, and "entirely consistent" with, those reported from Cuba. On June 6, 2018, The New York Times reported that at least two additional U.S. diplomats stationed at the Guangzhou consulate had been evacuated from China and reported that "it remains unclear whether the illnesses are the result of attacks at all. Other theories have included toxins, listening devices that accidentally emitted harmful sounds, or even mass hysteria." In June 2018, the State Department announced that a task force had been assembled to investigate the reports and expanded their health warning to all of mainland China amid reports some US diplomats outside of Guangzhou had experienced the same symptoms resembling a brain injury. The warning told anyone who experienced "unusual acute auditory or sensory phenomena accompanied by unusual sounds or piercing noises" to "not attempt to locate their source".

==== Elsewhere in Asia ====
A USAID employee at the U.S. embassy in Tashkent, Uzbekistan, reported a different incident in September 2017; the employee's report was discounted by the U.S. State Department.

In August 2021, it was reported that two American diplomats were evacuated from Hanoi, Vietnam, after incidents of Havana syndrome were reported. These reported cases also delayed Vice President Kamala Harris's visit to Vietnam.

In September 2021, an aide-de-camp of CIA director William J. Burns reported symptoms consistent with those of Havana syndrome on a diplomatic visit to India.

==== Washington, D.C. area ====
In 2019, a White House official reported experiencing debilitating symptoms while walking her dog in a Virginia suburb of Washington; the incident was publicly reported in 2020. In November 2020, a similar incident was reported on The Ellipse, a lawn adjacent to the south side of the White House. Both incidents were similar to those that were reported to have struck dozens of U.S. personnel overseas, including CIA and State Department personnel. Federal agencies investigated the incident at The Ellipse, and Defense Department officials briefed members of the Senate Armed Services Committee and House Armed Services Committee in April 2021. Investigators told members of Congress that they had not been able to determine the cause of the events or who was responsible.

==== Europe ====
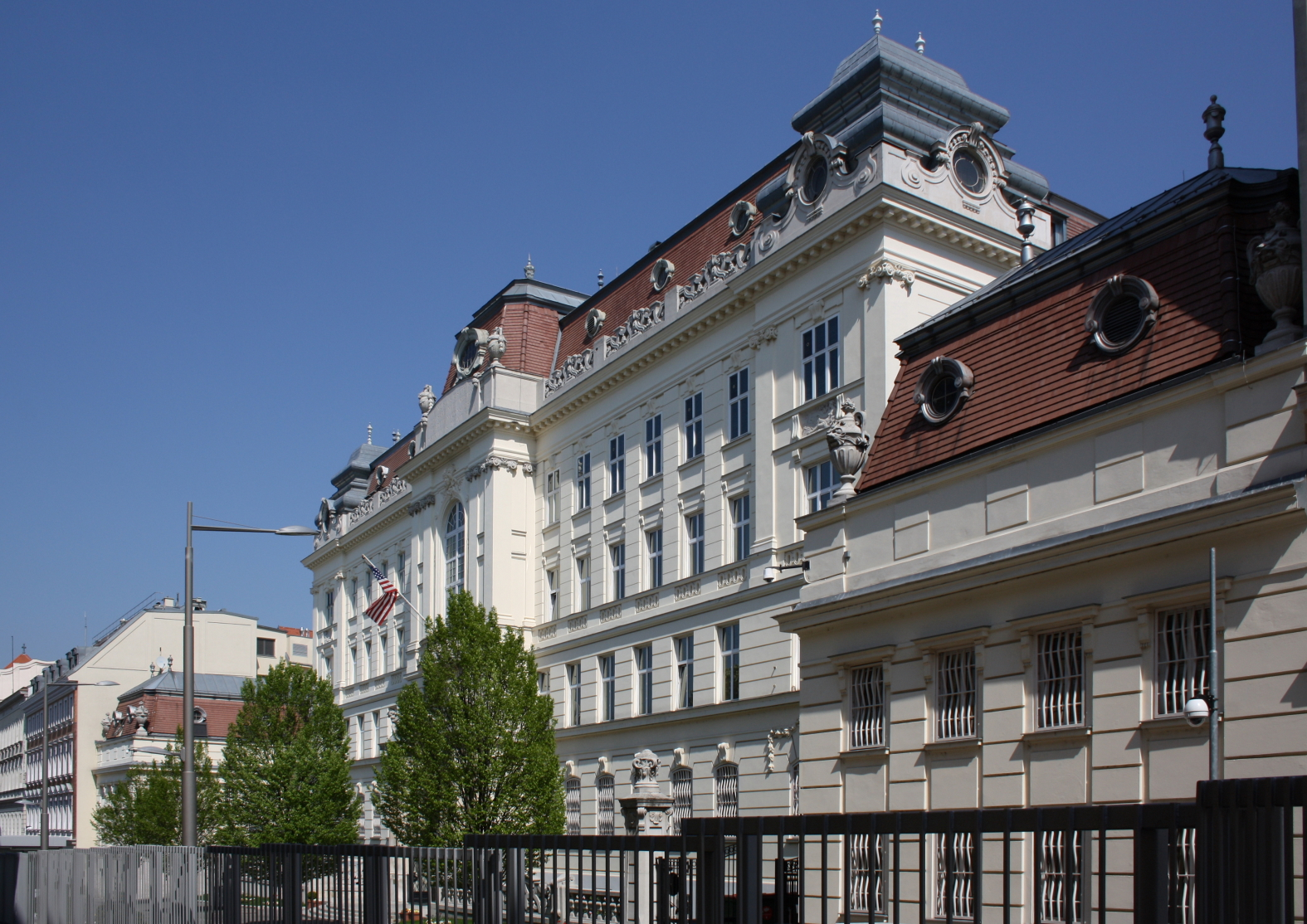
U.S. embassy in Vienna, Austria

In 2021, dozens of U.S. personnel stationed in Vienna, including diplomats, intelligence officials, and some children of U.S. employees, reported Havana syndrome-like symptoms.

The State Department confirmed in July 2021 that it was investigating the reports. The Austrian foreign ministry stated it was collaborating with American investigators. Aside from Havana, Vienna has reported the most incidents. In September 2021, the CIA station chief in Vienna (the top U.S. intelligence officer in the country) was recalled over concerns over his management; he had been criticized for not taking quicker action in response to the Havana syndrome cases at his post.

In the months preceding August 2021, cases of Havana syndrome were reported in Berlin, Germany, including from two U.S. officials who sought medical treatment. Several new cases were reported at the embassy in October 2021. In 2021, the CIA evacuated an intelligence officer serving in Serbia suspected of being a victim of the neurological attack. Three White House staffers reported symptoms at the InterContinental London Park Lane in late May 2019.

==== Elsewhere ====
In October 2021, it was reported that U.S. embassy personnel and their families in Bogota, Colombia, had developed symptoms consistent with Havana syndrome.

== History of investigations ==
=== 2018 ===
==== Developments ====
In January 2018, the State Department convened an accountability review board, led by retired United States Ambassador to Libya Peter Bodde, to review the department's handling of AHIs.

In March 2018, a team of computer scientists at the University of Michigan reported in a study that ultrasound—specifically, intermodulation distortion from multiple inaudible ultrasonic signals—from malfunctioning or improperly placed Cuban surveillance equipment could have been the origin of the reported sounds.

==== FBI investigations ====
In 2018, the FBI produced two reports on AHIs. The first, internally released in January, was a non-public report by the FBI's Operational Technology Division which found no evidence of a sonic attack or involvement of foreign adversaries.

A second FBI investigation in 2018 was conducted by the Behavioral Analysis Unit, which visited Havana and came to the assessment that the individuals were experiencing a mass psychogenic illness. The investigators did not speak to any of the affected people directly, instead relying on prior interviews other FBI investigators conducted with people that reported AHIs. According to The New Yorker, the unit also reviewed the patient histories compiled by the patients' neuropsychologists and other physicians, who had already ruled out mass psychogenic illness as a cause.

A November 2018 article in The New Yorker reported that the FBI's investigation was hindered by conflict with the CIA: the CIA was reluctant to reveal, even to other U.S. government agencies, the identities of affected officers because of concern about possible leaks. Federal rules on the privacy of employee medical records also hindered the investigation.

==== University of Pennsylvania study ====
At the U.S. government's request, University of Pennsylvania (UPenn) researchers examined 21 affected diplomats posted to Cuba, and the preliminary results were published in the Journal of the American Medical Association (JAMA) in March 2018. The researchers found "no evidence of white matter tract abnormalities" in affected diplomats beyond what might be seen in a control group of the same age, but described "a new syndrome in the diplomats that resembles persistent concussion". While some of those affected recovered swiftly, others had symptoms for months. The study concluded that "the diplomats appear to have sustained injury to widespread brain networks."

In September 2018, Douglas H. Smith, the lead author of the UPenn study, said in an interview that microwaves were "considered a main suspect" underlying the phenomenon. A 2018 study by Beatrice Alexandra Golomb determined that the symptoms and circumstances of AHIs were consistent with pulsed RF/MW radiation.

==== Criticism of University of Pennsylvania study ====
The same issue of JAMA that contained the UPenn study also contained an editorial criticizing it. The editorial criticized the lack of a control group, lack of baseline evaluations, and lack of experimental blinding. The editorial expressed concern that many of the measurements were based on patient self-reports or involved subjective interpretations. The editorial said that the UPenn study's conclusion (that the subjects suffered brain injuries) was flawed, because there were other (non-injury) explanations that were consistent with the symptoms, such as functional disorders, persistent postural-perceptual dizziness, or psychogenic causes.

The UPenn study was criticized again in JAMA, in August 2018, by several physicians and scientists who asserted that the study overlooked many other possible causes of the AHIs.

The UPenn study was also criticized in late 2018 by the neuroscience journal Cortex. The journal's editorial board, led by Sergio Della Sala, published a letter stating that the study had "gross methodological flaws" and asking the authors of the study to clarify their methods or retract the study. In the board's view, "Allowing such confused and conflicting explanations of methodology and analysis to pass unchallenged is a slippery path for science, and dangerous for society at large".

In late 2018, some scientists, including physicist Peter Zimmerman, bioengineers Kenneth R. Foster, and Andrei G. Pakhomov, and UCLA neurologist Robert Baloh, said that the microwave hypothesis was implausible; Baloh described the conclusions of the UPenn study as "science fiction".

In 2024, scientists with the NIH published a study of 86 AHI patients in which they were unable to replicate the UPenn results.

==== 2018 JASON report ====
In 2018, JASON, a group of physicists and scientists who advise the U.S. government, analyzed audio recordings from eight of the original 21 AHIs and two cellphone videos taken by one patient from Cuba. The report's findings were first reported in July 2019. Parts of JASON's report were declassified in September 2021.

The report concluded that the sounds in the audio recordings were "most likely" caused by insects and that it was "highly unlikely" that microwaves or ultrasound beams were involved, because "No plausible single source of energy (neither radio/microwaves nor sonic) can produce both the recorded audio/video signals and the reported medical effects." The group determined with "high confidence" that two audio sources were sounds from the Indies short-tailed cricket. The report stated "It cannot be ruled out that while the perceived sounds, while not harmful, are introduced by an adversary as deception so as to mask an entirely unrelated mode of causing illness." The report also concluded that while the cause of the condition was unknown, "psychogenic effects may serve to explain important components of the reported injuries".

=== 2019 ===
==== Analysis of insect noises ====
In January 2019, biologists Alexander L. Stubbs of the University of California, Berkeley and Fernando Montealegre-Z of the University of Lincoln analyzed audio recordings made by American personnel in Havana during incidents associated with Havana syndrome. The conclusion was that the sounds were the calling song of the Indies short-tailed cricket (Anurogryllus celerinictus) rather than those of a technological device. Stubbs and Montealegre-Z matched the song's "pulse repetition rate, power spectrum, pulse rate stability, and oscillations per pulse" to the recording. Stubbs and Montealegre wrote, "the causes of the health problems reported by embassy personnel are beyond the scope of this paper" and called for "more rigorous research into the source of these ailments, including the potential psychogenic effects, as well as possible physiological explanations unrelated to sonic attacks." This conclusion was comparable to a 2017 hypothesis by Cuban scientists that the sound on the same recording is that of Jamaican field crickets.

==== Psychogenic cause proposed ====
In a 2019 paper, Robert Bartholomew and Robert Baloh proposed that the AHIs represent a mass psychogenic illness rather than a "novel clinical entity". They cited the vagueness and inconsistency of symptoms as well as the circumstances they developed in (affected staff would have been under significant stress as the U.S. had just reopened its embassy in Cuba) as a cause. The scientists asserted that the Havana syndrome is an example of the nocebo effect — where the fear of an anticipated harmful event (e.g. an energy weapon attack) causes symptoms. The scientists noted that, even when AHIs are psychogenic in nature, the symptoms experienced by the patients can be authentic.

==== CDC report ====
In late 2017, the US Congress asked the Centers for Disease Control (CDC) to investigate the AHIs. In response, the CDC studied the medical histories of 95 diplomats and family members that reported symptoms. The report, published in December 2019, was given to Congress and to the executive branch, but not released to the public. The report concluded "The evaluations conducted thus far have not identified a mechanism of injury, process of exposure, effective treatment, or mitigating factor for the unexplained cluster of symptoms experienced by those stationed in Havana." The report noted that 15 of the 95 people reported similar symptoms, which occurred in two phases. Inconsistencies in the medical records, as well as long times between symptoms and medical tests, impaired the CDC's ability to draw clear conclusions from the medical data. The CDC decided not to conduct a retrospective case–control study because of the length of time between the event and the onset of symptoms, which could lead to recall and selection biases that "could generate misleading or obscured findings".

In December 2020, BuzzFeed news noticed that the NASEM report mentioned the CDC report, and so they made a FOIA request, and obtained the CDC report. In January 2021, Buzzfeed published the CDC report. Buzzfeed quoted neurologist Robert Baloh as saying "Essentially the CDC is saying that they have no idea what happened in Cuba."

=== 2020 ===
==== Department of Defense and CIA task forces ====
Near the end of the Trump administration, the Defense Department established a task force to investigate reports of attacks on DoD personnel abroad. The Department of Defense (DoD) established the task force partly due to frustration over what DoD officials considered to be a sluggish and lackluster response by the CIA and Department of State. Christopher C. Miller, who was acting defense secretary at the time, said in 2021 that "I knew CIA and Department of State were not taking this shit seriously and we wanted to shame them into it by establishing our task force." Miller said that he began to consider the reports of mysterious symptoms to be a high priority in December 2020, after he conducted an interview with a person with major combat experience who detailed symptoms.

In December 2020, the CIA established a task force to investigate. The agency set up the task force after continued reports of debilitating attacks against CIA officers in various places around the world. The CIA expanded its investigation under Director William J. Burns, who took office in 2021; Burns appointed a senior CIA officer who had previously led the manhunt for Osama bin Laden to lead the agency's investigation.

==== NASEM report ====
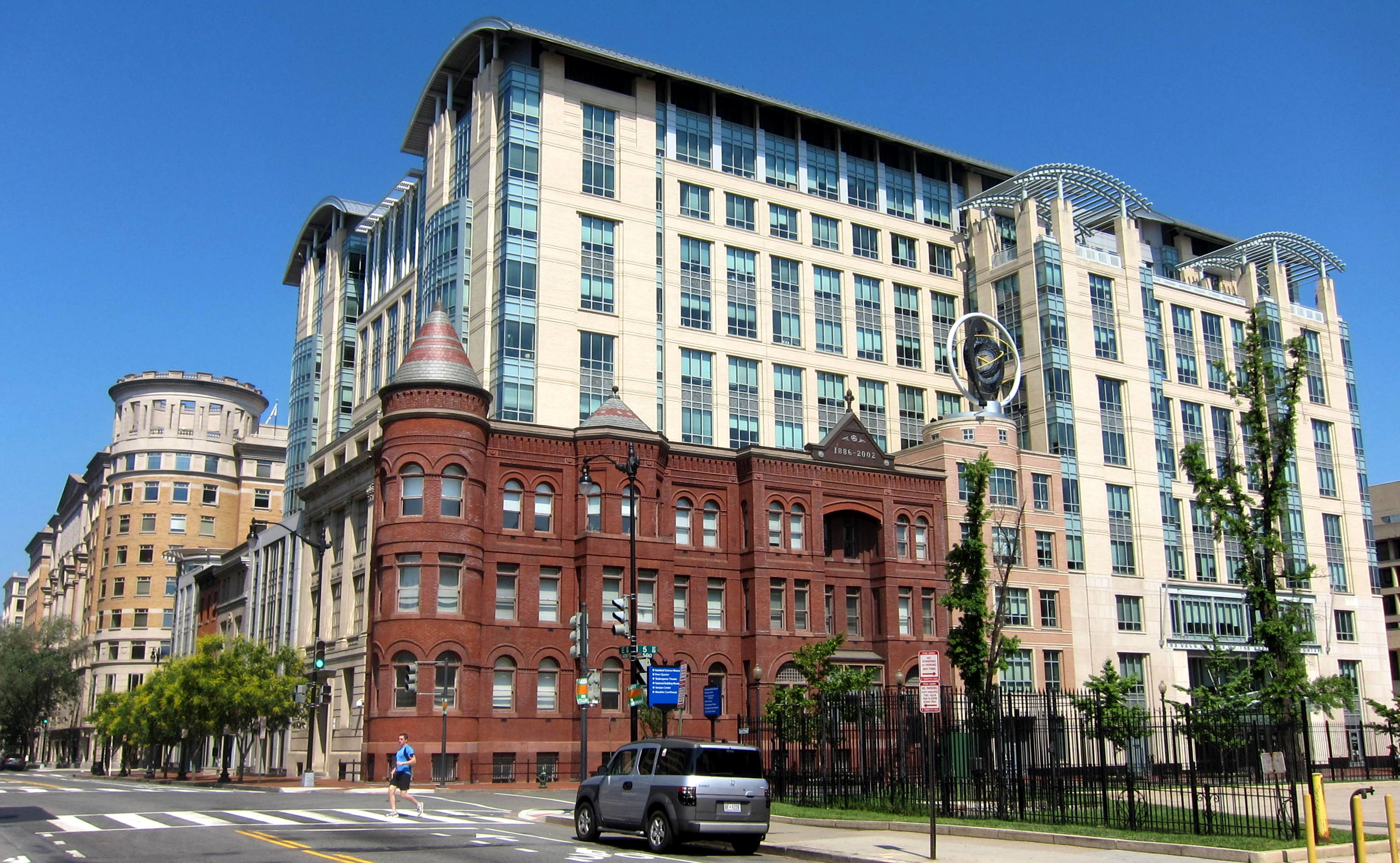
Building housing NASEM

The State Department commissioned the National Academies of Sciences, Engineering, and Medicine to study Havana syndrome. The committee met throughout 2020 and released their report in December 2020. The committee noted that lack of information and direct evidence (such as medical testing data about affected people) limited what it could conclude about the phenomenon, and that "each possible cause remains speculative" and that "the report should not be viewed as conclusive". The committee considered four causes: directed Radio Frequency (RF) energy, toxic chemicals, infectious diseases, and psychological issues. The committee deemed the RF pulses as the most plausible, with psychological causes as a secondary contributing factor. The committee considered toxic chemicals and infectious diseases as unlikely causes.

The committee found that many of the AHI symptoms were consistent with exposure to directed RF energy. The committee outlined additional research that needs to be conducted before concrete conclusions can be reached.

The NASEM study found that it was unlikely that the symptoms were caused by toxic chemicals, such as insecticides or pesticides, due to a lack of exposure to such chemicals, and because reported symptoms were not consistent with exposure to such chemicals. NASEM also found it highly unlikely that an infectious disease (such as Zika virus, which was an epidemic in Cuba in 2016–17) caused the illnesses.

The NASEM analysis considered psychogenic, social, and psychological causes for the symptoms, but was not able to draw a conclusion that these were likely or unlikely causes of most of the symptoms. The study stated that psychological causes were unlikely to be the cause of the acute and chronic auditory and vestibular symptoms that were reported by some patients.

In October 2021, Cheryl Rofer, a former chemist at the Los Alamos National Laboratory, said that there were no microwave experts on the NASEM committee and that "No evidence has been offered that such a weapon has been developed by any nation." Rofer also cited a 1978 study that found no adverse health effects from the Moscow Signal.

==== Media ====
In October 2020, the New York Times reported that U.S. diplomats and intelligence officers, including senior leaders, had clashed with Trump administration appointees, including CIA director Gina Haspel and State Department leaders, over the nature and causes of the suspected attacks. A New York Times investigation found that the State Department had "produced inconsistent assessments of patients and events, ignored outside medical diagnoses and withheld basic information from Congress". Despite the general view within the U.S. government that Russia was responsible, two U.S. officials told The New York Times that Haspel was not convinced of Russia's responsibility, or even whether an attack occurred.

Other media reported that many current and former U.S. officials stated that Russia was likely responsible for the alleged attacks, and that that suspicion was shared by both Trump and Biden administration officials. Other media reported that Russia has a history of researching, developing, and using weapons that cause brain injuries, such as the Cold War-era "Moscow Signal" targeting the American embassy in Moscow.

In 2020 the New York Times reported that a 2014 NSA report stated that a hostile nation possessed a microwave weapon capable of being aimed at a person's living quarters, causing nervous system damage; and that Russia has an interest in disrupting cooperation among the U.S., China, and Cuba. The same article reported that some AHI patients stationed in China and Cuba were working to increase cooperation with those countries, and some CIA analysts voiced suspicion Russia thus sought to derail their work.

In 2020, a book by Bartholomew and Baloh, Havana Syndrome: Mass Psychogenic Illness and the Real Story Behind the Embassy Mystery and Hysteria, was published; it argued in support of the psychogenic illness hypothesis.

=== 2021 ===
==== U.S. State Department ====
In February 2021, the U.S. State Department said that its ongoing investigation was "a high priority" for the department. Also in February, sources familiar with the various ongoing investigations told CNN that a primary obstacle to progress by the U.S. government in investigating the syndrome was a lack of coordination among the CIA, FBI, Centers for Disease Control and Prevention, and State Department, which conducted separate and "largely siloed" investigations. The limited coordination among the agencies was due in part to "the highly classified nature of some details and the privacy restrictions of health records, and that has hampered progress". In November, Secretary of State Blinken appointed two senior U.S. diplomats to oversee the department's internal Health Incident Response Task Force: career foreign service officer Ambassador Jonathan M. Moore as overall coordinator and retired Ambassador Margaret Uyehara.

==== Cuban Academy of Sciences ====
In September 2021, the Cuban Academy of Sciences released a report prepared by 21 scientists and academics. The report determined that prior analyses by United States scientists were biased and relied on evidence that was cherry-picked to support the narrative of attacks by a foreign adversary. The Cuban scientists stated that alternative explanations, including psychogenic causes, were suppressed in the US investigations. The Cuban report concluded that there is no weapon that can inflict the kinds of ailments reported, and that the most likely explanation of the syndrome was mass psychogenic illness, perhaps combined with prior existing medical conditions.

==== Media ====
In May 2021, The New Yorker reported that some unnamed officials in the government believe that GRU agents have been aiming microwave-radiation devices at U.S. officials, to obtain information from phones and computers, and that the radiation may be harmful. The article also quoted a government official who interviewed several overseas workers that reported episodes of pain or dizziness when near GRU locations. According to two unnamed officials interviewed by Politico, "While investigators have not determined definitively that these incidents are caused by a specific weapon, some believe any such device would be primarily transported by vehicle", and "Some could be small enough to fit into a large backpack, and an individual can be targeted from 500 to 1,000 yards away." An article in The Guardian interviewed experts regarding the feasibility of AHIs being caused by microwave weapons, and some of the experts stated that it was plausible, but others stated it was not plausible.

Citing unnamed intelligence and government officials, The New York Times reported in July 2021 that the National Security Council, Central Intelligence Agency, and Director of National Intelligence established two outside panels, one to investigate possible causes and the other to develop defensive countermeasures for personnel protection; cleared external scientists would be permitted to view relevant classified intelligence in their investigations.

In September 2021, it was reported that within the U.S. government, analysts had debated whether the alleged attacks reflected a deliberate attempt to cause injury, or whether the reported symptoms were "a consequence of a high-tech attempt to steal classified information from phones and computers of U.S. officials". Also in September, CIA Deputy Director David S. Cohen said that the investigation had "gotten closer" to making a determination, "but not close enough to make the analytic judgment that people are waiting for". Also in September, it was reported that multiple anecdotes from various Western diplomats stationed overseas, including in Russia, describe mysterious ailments during past decades that might be due to microwave devices.

=== 2022 ===
==== DNI scientific panel report ====
In February 2022, the Director of National Intelligence released a summary of a report written by a panel of scientists. Regarding AHI patients that reported four particular "core" symptoms, the report determined that pulsed electromagnetic energy and ultrasound were plausible causes for those cases. The report stated that psychogenic factors could explain the other instances of AHI (that did not involve all four core symptoms).

==== CIA Report ====
In January 2022, the Central Intelligence Agency issued an interim report that summarized an ongoing study of roughly 1,000 reported cases of AHI. The study concluded that it was unlikely that a foreign power was responsible for the AHIs, and that the study had not yet found evidence of involvement by a state actor. The report said that most of the reviewed cases could be explained by natural causes such as environmental causes, undiagnosed medical conditions, or stress. The study identified about 24 cases for which foreign involvement could not be ruled out, and said that investigation is continuing.

==== 2022 JASON Report ====
On February 10, 2022, the State Department released unclassified portions of a report it had commissioned from the JASON Advisory Group. The study found that 80–90% of the incidents could be easily explained by everyday occurrences or other unrelated factors. For the 10–20% that could not be easily explained, JASON was not able to perform a statistical analysis due to lack of data on a comparable background population, small numbers, and generally low data quality.

The study also examined whether or not electromagnetic radiation could be the cause of AHIs. The study concluded that several forms of radiation could be ruled out, including ionizing radiation, acoustic energy, and RF energy at frequencies less than 500 MHz or greater than 30 GHz. After considering factors such as ability to aim and to penetrate building walls, the remaining frequencies—between 500 MHz and 30 GHz—were determined to be a "highly unlikely" cause, although they could not be conclusively ruled out.

=== 2023 ===
==== 2023 U.S. intelligence report ====
On March 1, 2023, the House Intelligence Committee released a report, titled "Intelligence Community Assessment", which was jointly prepared by seven U.S. intelligence agencies and published by the Office of the Director of National Intelligence (ODNI). The report concluded "that there is no credible evidence that a foreign adversary has a weapon or collection device that is causing AHIs". The agencies preparing the report reviewed thousands of possible cases of Havana syndrome. The reported stated that there continues to be scientific debate about whether a weapon could produce such health effects.

Five of the seven agencies involved in generating the report concluded "the available intelligence consistently points against the involvement of US adversaries in causing the reported incidents" and that a foreign adversary's involvement was "very unlikely". One of the other agencies concluded that foreign involvement was "unlikely", and the seventh agency declined to make a finding.

Two of the seven agencies had "high confidence in this judgment while three agencies have moderate confidence". Two other agencies judged "that deliberate causal mechanisms are unlikely to have caused AHIs" but those agencies had "low confidence because they judge(d) that radiofrequency (RF) energy is a plausible cause for AHIs, based in part on the findings of the IC Expert Panel and the results of research by some US laboratories."

Regarding the study, government officials said: "There is no one explanation for these incidents. Instead, there are many different possible causes including environmental as well as social factors and preexisting medical conditions." The officials also said that the investigative efforts were 'extremely aggressive' and involved "a high degree of risk", and "Intelligence officers vigorously studied what happened in the hours, days and weeks surrounding the incidents... In some instances they found malfunctioning HVAC systems, which can cause discomfort to humans, and in other cases there were computer mice that created surprising disruptions... We weren't finding what we expected to find... There is no one explanation for any of this."

Of the report, CIA Director William J. Burns said, "The intelligence community assessment released today by ODNI reflects more than two years of rigorous, painstaking collection, investigative work, and analysis by IC agencies including CIA... We applied the agency's very best operational, analytic, and technical tradecraft to what is one of the largest and most intensive investigations in the agency's history."

Politico summarized the results by saying, "The finding undercuts a years-long narrative, propped up by more than a thousand reports from government employees, that a foreign adversary used pulsed electromagnetic energy waves to sicken Americans."

==== Reactions ====
Following release of the March 2023 report, Trump's national security adviser John Bolton stated that when the Cuban attack reports began, he "pretty quickly" came to believe that attacks were not in Cuba's interest, and that he thought it was beyond Cuba's capabilities. He assumed Russia was involved, but said that he chose not to brief the president on that, as he did not think Trump would support that theory due to his association with Vladimir Putin.

Upon release of the report, Cuba's Vice Foreign Minister Carlos Fernandez de Cossio told Reuters, "The unfortunate thing is the U.S. government leveraged [Havana syndrome] to derail bilateral relations... and discredit Cuba." Reuters also reported that "Cuba has for years labeled as 'science fiction' the idea that 'Havana Syndrome' resulted from an attack by a foreign agent, and its top scientists in 2021 found no evidence of such allegations."

Despite the report's conclusion, U.S. Senator Marco Rubio, the vice chairman of the Senate Intelligence Committee, issued a statement on March 2 rejecting the finding, saying, "Something happened here, and just because you don't have all the answers doesn't mean that it didn't happen." Rubio said his panel would continue an independent review of the claims.

==== International Journal of Social Psychiatry ====
During 2023, the International Journal of Social Psychiatry published several articles and commentaries supporting the psychogenic hypothesis, criticizing the energy weapon hypothesis, and questioning whether some earlier Havana syndrome studies published in JAMA were inappropriately influenced by politics.

=== 2024 ===
==== NIH Clinical Center studies ====
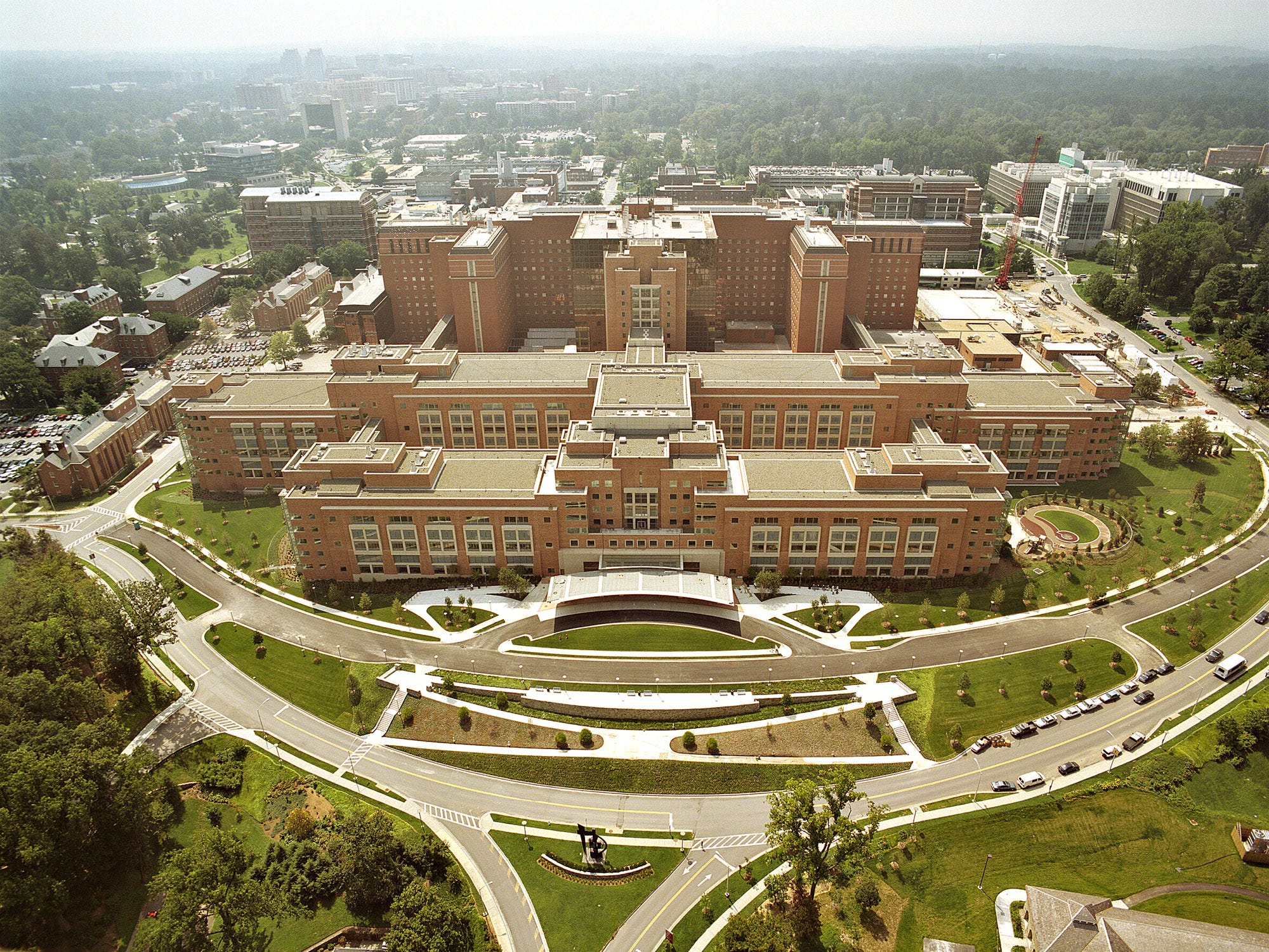
NIH Clinical Center

In April, scientists at the National Institutes of Health Clinical Center published the results of two studies conducted over five years on two groups of federal employees (81 and 86 people) who experienced anomalous health incidents (AHIs). The studies did not find any brain injuries or persistent physiologic changes, when comparing AHI patients to a control group. One of the researchers noted that many of the patients are experiencing high levels of stress and anxiety, which can negatively impact their recovery from original AHIs.

The authors of the first NIH study concluded that "This ... study ... revealed no significant differences in imaging measures of brain structure or function between individuals reporting AHIs and matched control participants after adjustment for multiple comparisons." Differences between the AHI individuals and the control group were statistically insignificant, after compensating for errors related to multiple measurements.

The authors of the second NIH study concluded that "there were no significant differences between individuals reporting AHIs and matched control participants with respect to most clinical, research, and biomarker measures, except for objective and self-reported measures of imbalance and symptoms of fatigue, post traumatic stress, and depression. This study did not replicate the findings of previous studies [which reported evidence of brain injuries]".

The journal Applied Radiology summarized the results as finding "no significant evidence of MRI-detectable brain injury, nor differences in most clinical measures compared to controls".

==== Media ====
In March 2024, three news sources published the results of a joint investigation: The Insider, 60 Minutes, and Der Spiegel. The journalists interviewed people that stated that some AHIs were possibly caused by actions of Russian military intelligence, specifically that members of the GRU Unit 29155, known for undertaking foreign operations, received awards and promotions for work related to the development and deployment of "non-lethal acoustic weapons". The journalists also interviewed sources that stated that telephone and travel records of some GRU agents matched the locations where a few U.S. personnel in China and Georgia reported AHIs. The Kremlin Press Secretary dismissed the report as "nothing more than baseless, unfounded accusations by the media." In response to the report, the White House Press Secretary said that a "foreign adversary is very unlikely." US vice presidential candidate JD Vance ridiculed the report, saying that the journalists had "lost their minds".

=== 2025 ===
==== Update to the 2023 U.S. intelligence report ====
In January 2025, the U.S. intelligence community published an update to their 2023 report. The update stated that five of the seven components of the community continue to assess it "very unlikely" that a foreign actor is responsible. All intelligence agencies "agree that most of the new intelligence [since March 2023] was consistent with the judgments reached in the [2023 report]." The update stated that two of the seven components shifted "their assessments about whether a foreign actor has a capability that could cause biological effects consistent with some of the symptoms reported as possible AHIs", leading those two components to "subtly change their overall judgment about whether a foreign actor might have played a role in a small number of events". One of those two components continues to assess it is "unlikely a foreign actor has deployed such a weapon in any events reported as possible AHIs."

=== 2026 ===
==== Reports of suspected device ====
Anonymous sources claimed that Homeland Security Investigations purchased a device in an undercover operation for millions of dollars toward the end of the Biden administration. The backpack-sized device is said to emit pulsed radio frequencies. Testing is said to be ongoing and some are skeptical that this device could be the cause of Havana syndrome.

According to CBS, "[t]he device is portable, backpack-sized, and contains components of Russian origin". In March 2026, a 60 Minutes report further described the weapon:

It doesn't look anything like a gun. It is designed to be concealed and small enough to be carried by a person. It is silent and doesn't create heat like a microwave oven. Our sources say the device is programmable for different scenarios and can be operated by remote control. The range of the beam is several hundred feet. It can penetrate windows and drywall. The vital components were made in Russia. Our sources say the key is not the hardware but the software. The programming shapes a unique, electromagnetic wave that rises and falls abruptly and pulses rapidly.

==== First to report symptoms dies ====
On January 29, 2026, Michael Beck, the first to report any symptoms of Havana syndrome, died at the age of 65. He had been diagnosed with Parkinson's disease at 45. In 2014, he had filed a workers' compensation for hazardous conditions that was denied.

==== Norwegian test ====
In February 2026, The Washington Post reported that a test was conducted by a Norwegian government scientist in 2024. The scientist reportedly constructed a device that emits pulses of microwave energy and tested it on himself to determine whether it would produce neurological effects. According to the anonymous sources, he suffered symptoms that were not exactly identical to those of AHI, but the test strengthened the evidence that microwave may affect human biology.

==== Laser hypothesis ====
In January 2026, Alexander Kostinsky, a research fellow at the Nuclear Physics Institute of the Czech Academy of Sciences, proposed that symptoms akin to Havana syndrome could be induced via the optoacoustic effect from a pulsed infrared laser, which he argued could be made portable and covert, in contrast to high-power microwave systems. In a March 2026 article by T-invariant discussing Kostinsky's hypothesis, interviews with scientists previously involved in Havana syndrome research did not identify specific technical objections to the proposed mechanism, although concerns about potential retinal damage were noted.

== Other responses ==
=== Cuban government ===
After the initial AHIs were made public in 2017, the Cuban foreign minister accused the U.S. of lying about the incident and denied Cuban involvement in or knowledge of the cause of the health problems the diplomats experienced.

The Cuban government offered to cooperate with the U.S. in an investigation of the incidents. It employed about 2,000 scientists and law enforcement officers who interviewed 300 neighbors of diplomats, examined two hotels, and medically examined non-diplomats who could have been exposed. NBC reported that Cuban officials stated that they analyzed air and soil samples and considered a range of toxic chemicals. They also examined the possibility that electromagnetic waves were to blame, and even looked into whether insects could be the culprit, but found nothing they could link to the claimed medical symptoms. The FBI and Cuban authorities met to discuss the situation; the Cubans stated that the U.S. neither agreed to share the diplomats' medical records with Cuban authorities nor allowed Cuban investigators access to U.S. diplomats' homes to conduct tests.

In 2021, a panel of scientists affiliated with the Cuban Academy of Sciences and convened by the Cuban government reported that "the narrative of the 'mysterious syndrome' is not scientifically acceptable in any of its components." The panel addressed the microwave hypothesis directly, writing, "No known form of energy can selectively cause brain damage (with laser-like spatial accuracy) under the conditions described for the alleged incidents in Havana."

After release of the March 2023 U.S. intelligence agencies' report which concluded that "available intelligence consistently points against the involvement of US adversaries in causing the reported incidents" and that a foreign adversary's involvement was "very unlikely", Cuba's Vice Foreign Minister Carlos Fernandez de Cossio told Reuters, "The unfortunate thing is the U.S. government leveraged [Havana syndrome] to derail bilateral relations ... and discredit Cuba." The Reuters article reported that "Cuba has for years labeled as 'science fiction' the idea that 'Havana Syndrome' resulted from an attack by a foreign agent, and its top scientists in 2021 found no evidence of such allegations."

=== U.S. executive branch ===
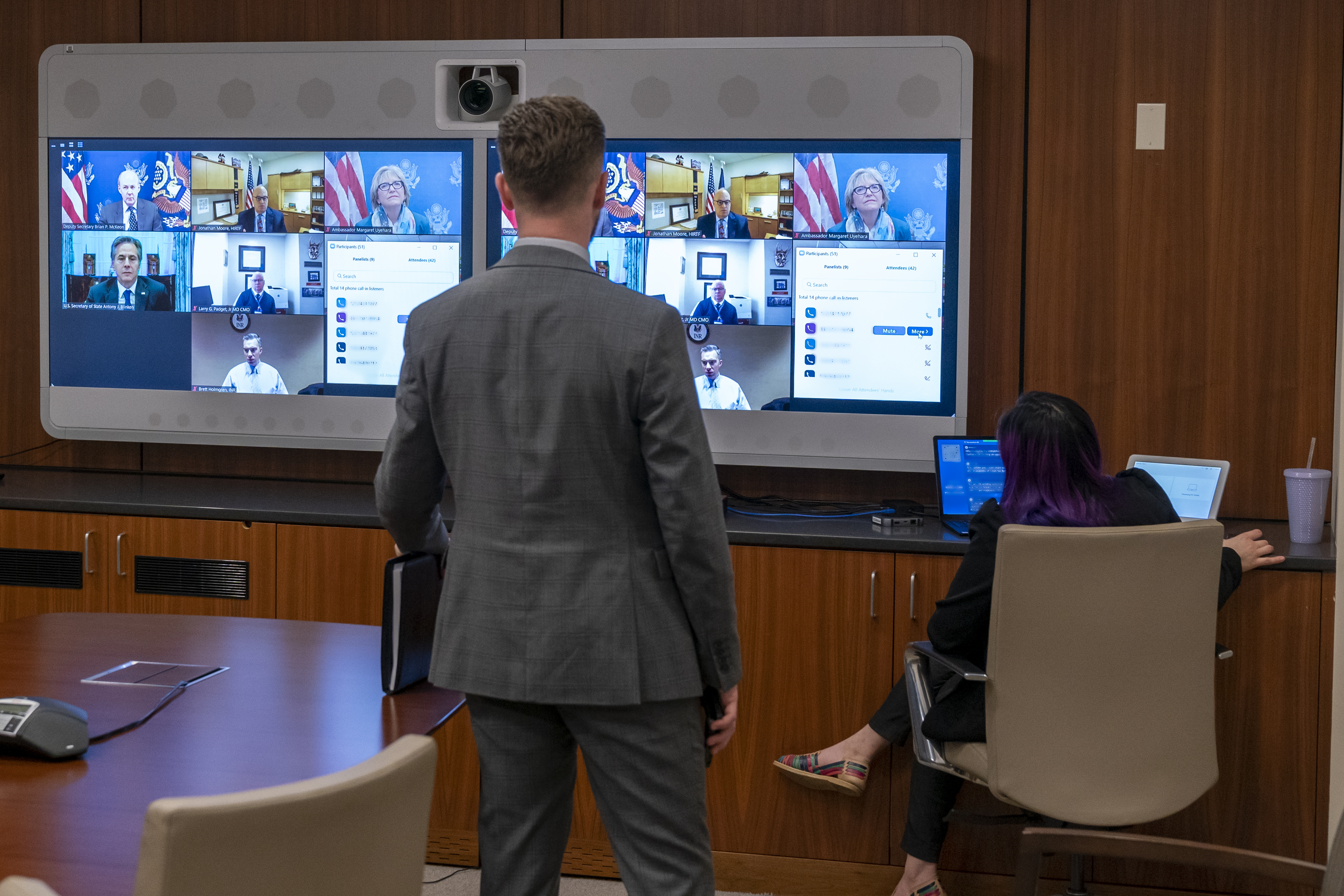
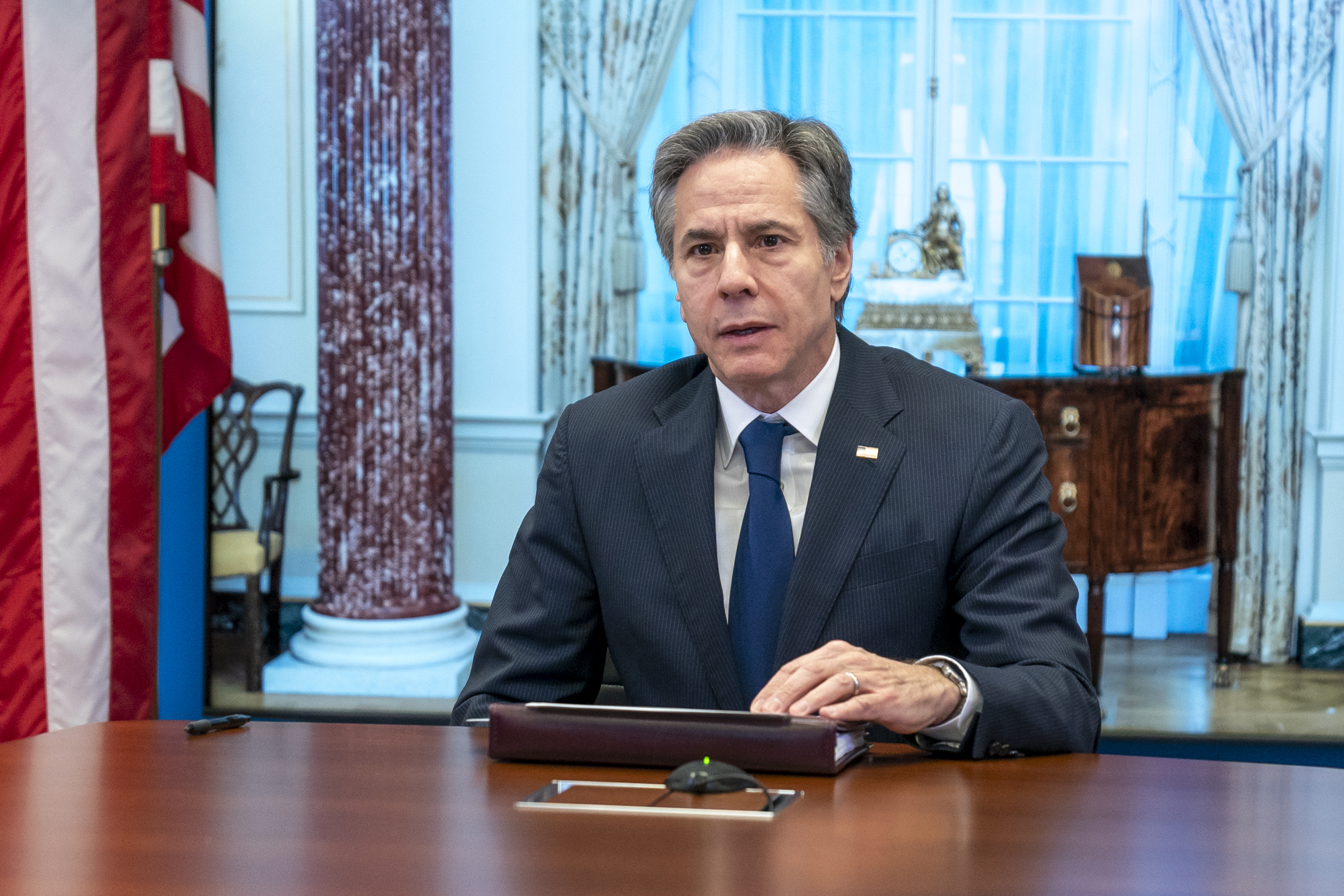
Secretary Blinken virtually meets with State Department employees affected by Anomalous Health Incidents, March 16, 2022.

In March 2021, the State Department appointed ambassador Pamela L. Spratlen, a career foreign service officer, to oversee the department task force charged with responding to the incidents. Six months later, Spratlen left her position as coordinator of the task force because she "reached the threshold of hours of labor" that she could perform as a retiree. Her resignation had been demanded by people angered by her handling of a conference call with affected employees. During the call with employees (in which Secretary of State Antony Blinken also took part), Spratlen did not take a position on whether the AHIs were psychogenic, a response that affected diplomats called "invalidating".

In late 2022 the US Defense Health Agency issued Form 244, Anomalous Health Incident (AHI) Acute Assessment, described as "a multi-domain assessment that should be used to evaluate patients for potential AHI".

==== Medical care ====
The DoD is responsible for providing medical care to patients reporting AHI symptoms. In July 2024, the Government Accountability Office (GAO) issued a report that surveyed the DoD's actions in providing medical care to AHI patients. The GAO interviewed 65 of the 334 people that qualified for health care provided by the DoD. Based on the interviews, the GAO found that the AHI patients were often confused by the process to obtain care. The GAO made several recommendations to the DoD, with the goal of streamlining the process and improving communications. The DoD said it is working on implementing the recommendations, but does not yet have concrete dates when they will be implemented.

In May 2024, a former CIA employee, who reported AHI symptoms and is now an advocate for other AHI patients, claimed that the CIA required him to participate in the NIH study as a prerequisite to obtaining medical care for his AHI symptoms. The CIA denied the allegation. The NIH investigated the claim, and discovered no coercion on the part of NIH personnel. Since the participant perceived he was coerced by the CIA, the NIH terminated the AHI studies in September 2024, to avoid the appearance of possible violation of medical ethics guidelines.

=== U.S. Congress ===
In early 2021, Defense Department investigators briefed members of Congress about the November 2020 incident at The Ellipse near the White House. The DoD discussed the matter, even though it occurred within the U.S.; this was because the DoD investigation was more advanced than the FBI or the intelligence community investigations.

The Senate Intelligence Committee leadership said in 2021 that it was working with the CIA on connection with the AHI investigation, saying, "We have already held fact finding hearings on these debilitating attacks, many of which result in medically confirmed cases of Traumatic Brain Injury, and will do more."

The National Defense Authorization Act for Fiscal Year 2022, passed by Congress in December 2021, included a section directing the president to designate a senior official as "anomalous health incidents interagency coordinator" to oversee efforts across the federal government and to coordinate with the White House Office of Science and Technology Policy, required relevant federal agencies to designate a specific high-level "anomalous health incident agency coordination lead" and directed agencies to develop guidance to employees considered to be at risk of exposure.

A Republican-led subcommittee of the House of Representatives, responsible for overseeing the CIA, issued an interim report in December 2024 criticizing the Biden administration and CIA leadership. The subcommittee, led by a Republican representative, said the 2023 report published by the ODNI intelligence agencies lacked analytic integrity, and that it contained conflicting assessments. The subcommittee wrote ".... the Biden Administration’s failure to adequately prioritize collection on this threat has likely resulted in lost opportunities...The Biden Administration and IC [Intelligence Community] leadership has sought to hinder the Subcommittee’s investigation." The subcommittee report was criticized by a Democratic member of the House.

==== Financial compensation ====
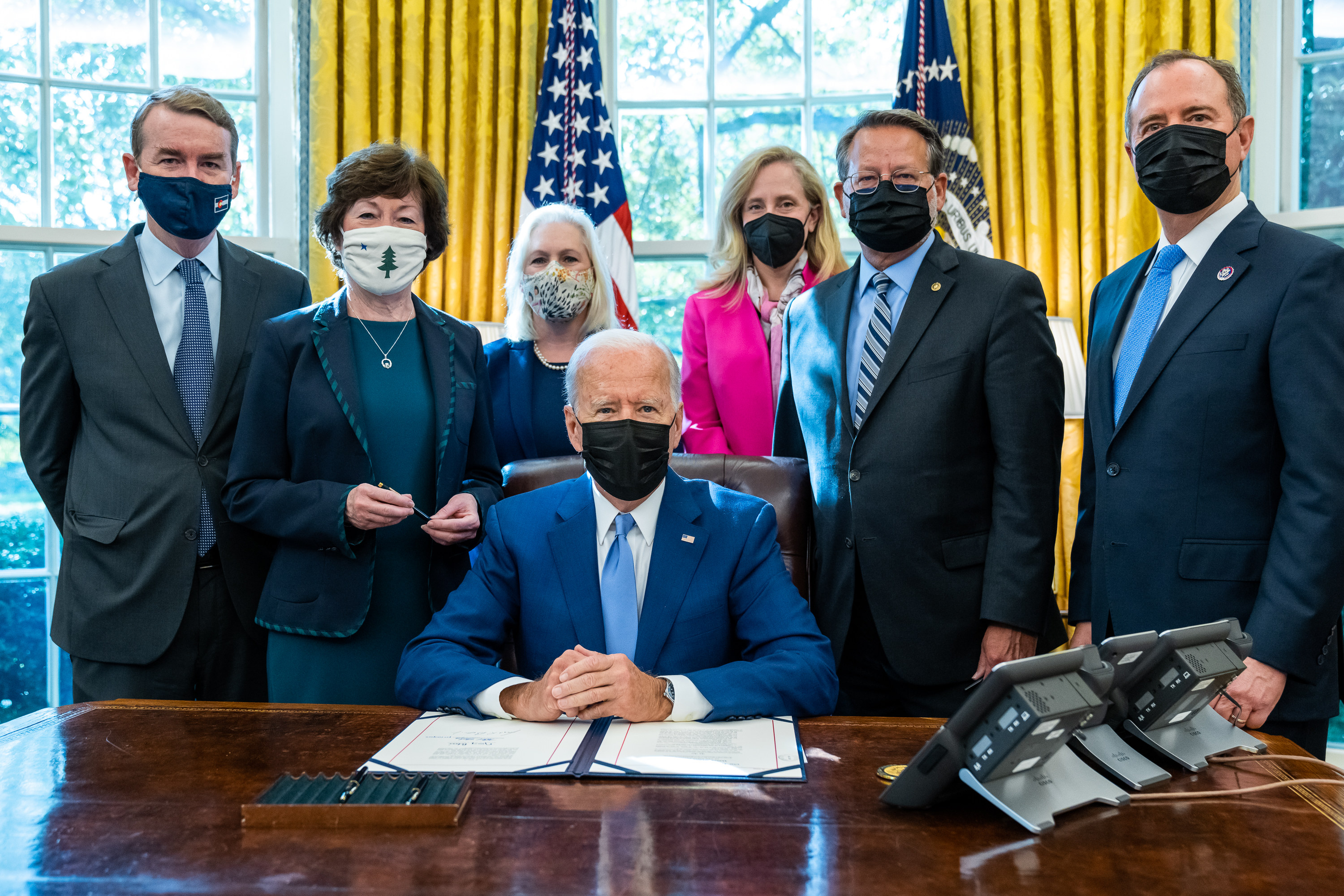
President Joe Biden signing the HAVANA Act on October 8, 2021

In response to Havana syndrome, United States senator Susan Collins introduced a bill (S. 1828), cosponsored by a bipartisan group of nine other senators, that would close a loophole in the Federal Employees' Compensation Act that would normally not cover damage to organs such as the brain and heart. In 2021, Congress passed the Helping American Victims Afflicted by Neurological Attacks (HAVANA) Act, which authorized the CIA director and the secretary of state to provide financial support for personnel with brain injuries. The bill passed the House and Senate unanimously and was signed into law by president Joe Biden on October 8, 2021, becoming Public Law No. 117-46. The law gives an untaxed lump-sum payment of up to one year's full salary ($187,300 for higher-ranking employees) to government employees that provide evidence of neurological injury. The payment is in addition to workers' compensation or disability payments.

=== Animal experimentation ===
In March 2023, Politico reported that the U.S. Army funded a $750,000 grant to Wayne State University for a study to expose 48 ferrets to RF waves, comparing the effects to those from a control group of ferrets; the Department of Defense described the project as an attempt to "develop and test a novel laboratory animal model to mimic mild concussive head injury" similar to those reported by the embassy personnel in Havana and China. Politico also reported that the U.S. Department of Defense had recently tested RF waves on primates. The animal rights group PETA demanded that the Pentagon end live-animal testing in relation to Havana syndrome.

=== Lawsuits and advocacy ===
In October 2022, CNN reported that about three dozen CIA officers had accused the agency of dragging its feet in the investigation, including some who had filed formal whistleblower complaints. In 2021, a State Department employee who reported AHIs in Cuba in 2017 filed a lawsuit against the government, claiming they unfairly denied him disability payments. A State Department employee who reported AHI symptoms while working in China in 2017 filed a whistleblower complaint against the State Department in 2020, alleging that the State Department retaliated against him for publicly complaining about the government's handling of AHIs; the State Department later settled the complaint without admitting liability.

In February 2019, several Canadian diplomats sued the Canadian government, arguing that it failed to protect them or promptly address serious health concerns. The government has sought to dismiss the suit, arguing in November 2019 that it was not negligent and did not breach its duties to its employees. In court filings, the government acknowledged that several of the 14 plaintiffs in the suit had concussion-like symptoms but said that no definitive cause or medical diagnosis had been ascertained.

In a November 2019 statement, Global Affairs Canada said, "We continue to investigate the potential causes of the unusual health symptoms."

== See also ==
- Active Denial System – Non-lethal, directed-energy weapon (2002–current)
- Conversion disorder – Former psychiatric diagnosis
- Cuba–United States relations
- Electromagnetic hypersensitivity – Claimed sensitivity to electromagnetic fields
- Electronic harassment – Delusion regarding mind manipulation by electronic means
- Health scare – Social phenomenon
- MEDUSA (weapon) – Directed-energy non-lethal weapon
- Microwave auditory effect – Concept in human perception of sound
- Nocebo effect – Harmful effect from negative belief
- Post-concussion syndrome – Neurological disorder after a concussion
- Russia–United States relations
- Somatic symptom disorder – Excessive focus on distressing physical symptoms
- Radiophobia – Fear of ionizing radiation

== Sources ==
- Relman, David A.; Pavlin, Julie, eds. (2020). An Assessment of Illness in U.S. Government Employees and Their Families at Overseas Embassies. Bibcode:2020nap..book25889N. doi:10.17226/25889. ISBN 978-0-309-68137-7. PMID 33411434.
