= Targeted individual =

Targeted individual may refer to:

- The subject of:
  - Gang stalking, a persecutory delusion of mobbing
  - Mobbing, bullying or harassment of an individual by a group
  - Targeted advertising, advertising to a target audience
  - Targeted killing, an extrajudicial assassination by a government
  - Targeted surveillance, surveillance of a person of interest
- An individual claiming to experience electronic harassment
