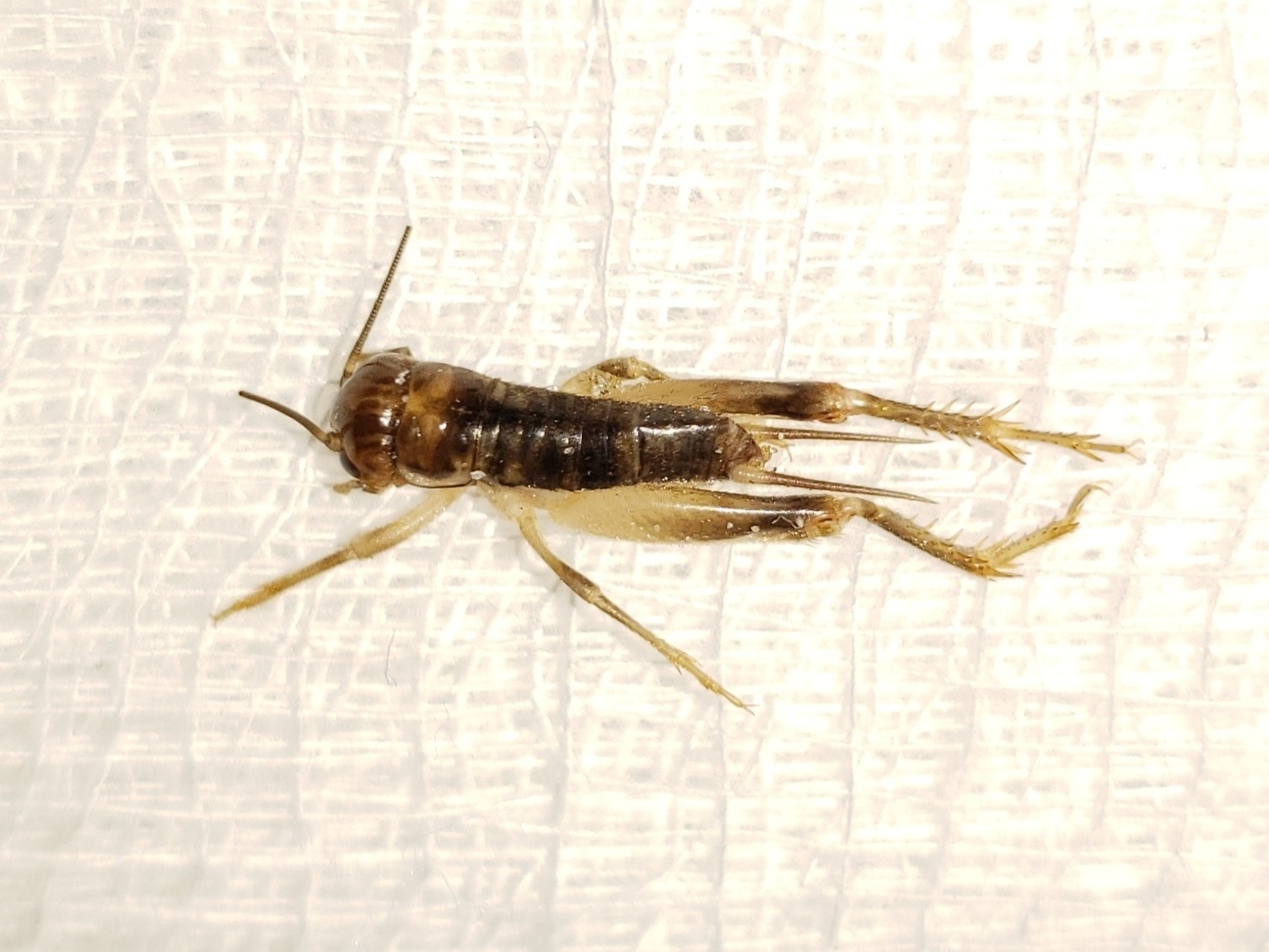

Scientific classification
- Domain: Eukaryota
- Kingdom: Animalia
- Phylum: Arthropoda
- Class: Insecta
- Order: Orthoptera
- Suborder: Ensifera
- Family: Gryllidae
- Genus: Anurogryllus
- Species: A. arboreus

Binomial name
- Anurogryllus arboreus Walker, 1973

= Anurogryllus arboreus =

Species of cricket

Anurogryllus arboreus, the common short-tailed cricket or arboreal short-tailed cricket, is a species of cricket in the family Gryllidae. It is native to the southern and south-eastern United States where it lives in a burrow that it digs.

== Description ==
Like other short-tail crickets in its genus, the adult A. arboreus is a pale brown cricket with a vestigial ovipositor. When it first matures, the adult insect has wings, but it soon sheds these and is afterwards flightless.

== Taxonomy and distribution ==
At one time, nearly all the short-tailed crickets in the United States were considered to belong to the species Anurogryllus muticus, the range of which extended from Canada to much of South America. In a revision of the genus made by T. J. Walker in 1973, Anurogryllus arboreus was split off on the basis of the behavior of the male when calling, and on certain morphological differences. A. arboreus occurs primarily along the Atlantic Coast from New Jersey to Florida and westward to southeastern Texas. The only other species of Anurogryllus found in the United States is A. celerinictus, which occurs on the Florida Keys.

== Behavior ==
A. arboreus lives solitarily in a burrow which it digs, carrying soil particles to the surface with its mandibles. Males dig temporary burrows but females may reside in one burrow for an extended period. Besides the main tunnel, typically 10 to 20 centimetres (4 to 8 in) long, there are side chambers in which the insect resides and feeds, and a refuse chamber used to deposit fecal pellets and discarded vegetable matter. Some lateral tunnels are dug to enable the cricket to feed on plant roots without emerging on the soil surface. Except when the insect is outside foraging or looking for a mate, the entrance to the burrow is kept plugged with soil or vegetation.

Breeding takes place once a year between April and June. The male emerges from his burrow at nightfall and calls from a perch in a tree or other high place in the early part of the night. When a female is attracted, mating may take place near the perch, or in a burrow. The female lays several dozen eggs in a breeding chamber and defends her burrow fiercely against the intrusion of males. She tends the eggs by palpating them and turning them over, and gathers and deposits bits of vegetation on which the newly-hatched nymphs feed. She also lays trophic (unfertilised) eggs for their nourishment. The nymphs keep together in a compact group, often on the roof of the chamber, and follow the female about when she is nearby. The female typically dies when the nymphs are part grown, and soon afterwards they disperse and dig their own burrows.
