= Gang stalking =

Persecutory belief system

Gang stalking or group-stalking is a set of persecutory delusions in which those affected believe they are being followed, stalked, and harassed by a large number of people. The term is associated with the virtual community formed by people who consider themselves "targeted individuals" ("T.I."), claiming their lives are disrupted from being stalked by organized groups intent on causing them harm.

== Terminology ==
The concept of stalking arose in the 1980s following increased legal equity for women and prosecution of domestic violence. Actual stalking generally has a single perpetrator, who may sometimes recruit others to act vicariously on their behalf, usually unwittingly. Beginning in the early 2000s, the term gang stalking became popularized to describe supposed harassment from multiple people who organize around a shared purpose, with no one person being solely responsible.

== Online communities ==
A 2016 article in The New York Times estimated that more than 10,000 people were participating in online communities "organized around the conviction that its members are victims of a sprawling conspiracy to harass thousands of everyday Americans with mind-control weapons and armies of so-called gang stalkers". The article identified a 2015 paper by Sheridan and James entitled "Complaints of group stalking ('gang stalking'): an exploratory study of their nature and impact on complainants" as the only scientific study of the topic at the time.

Hundreds of these communities exist online. News reports have described how groups of Internet users have cooperated to exchange detailed conspiracy theories involving gang stalking. Kershaw & Weinberger say, "Web sites that amplify reports of mind control and group stalking" are "an extreme community that may encourage delusional thinking" and represent "a dark side of social networking. They may reinforce the troubled thinking of the mentally ill and impede treatment." A 2020 study established a framework to classify and examine the phenomenon of individuals with the subjective experience of being gang stalked. The study confirmed the subsequent serious sequelae of their experience and recommended further research.

== Persecutory delusion ==
Those who believe they are victims perceive the stalkers' motivation is to disrupt every part of their lives. The stalking activities involved are described as including electronic harassment, the use of "psychotronic weapons", directed-energy weapons, cyberstalking, hypnotic suggestion transmitted through remotely-accessed electronic devices, and other alleged mind control techniques. These have been reported by external observers as being examples of belief systems as opposed to reports of objective phenomena. Among communities of self-identifying targeted individuals, gang stalking is described as a shared experience where the gang stalkers all coordinate to harass sets of individuals, with the communities serving as a venue to share the perceived experiences of victimization.

A study from Australia and the United Kingdom by Lorraine Sheridan and David James compared 128 self-defined victims of gang stalking with a randomly selected group of 128 self-declared victims of stalking by an individual. All 128 "victims" of gang stalking were judged to be delusional, compared with only 5 victims of individual stalking. The research found highly significant differences between the two samples on depressive symptoms, post-traumatic symptomatology and adverse impact on social and occupational function, with the self-declared victims of gang stalking being more severely affected. The authors concluded that "group stalking appears to be delusional in basis, but complainants suffer marked psychological and practical sequelae. This is important in the assessment of risk in stalking cases, early referral to psychiatric services and allocation of police resources."

While a great majority of those who claim to be targeted individuals do not pose danger to others, a 2018 analysis found that some have acted out with violence, sometimes extreme. In 2022, a reported believer in gang stalking was accused of killing four people in Ohio; he uploaded a video before the shooting in which he said that he wanted to "help other targeted individuals", and that he would conduct "the first counterattack against mind control in history". A manifesto was found on the shooter's computer, in which he wrote that his neighbors were mind-controlling terrorists.

== Notable claimants ==
- James Tilly Matthews (1770–1815), English businessman
- Francis E. Dec (1926–1996), American lawyer
- Gloria Naylor (1950–2016), American novelist
- Isaac Brock (1975–present), American musician

== See also ==
- Electronic harassment
- Cyberstalking
- Mass surveillance
- Psychosis
- The Truman Show delusion
- Stalking § Stalking by groups, for real-world stalking by groups
