= John Haslam (physician) =

English apothecary, physician and medical writer

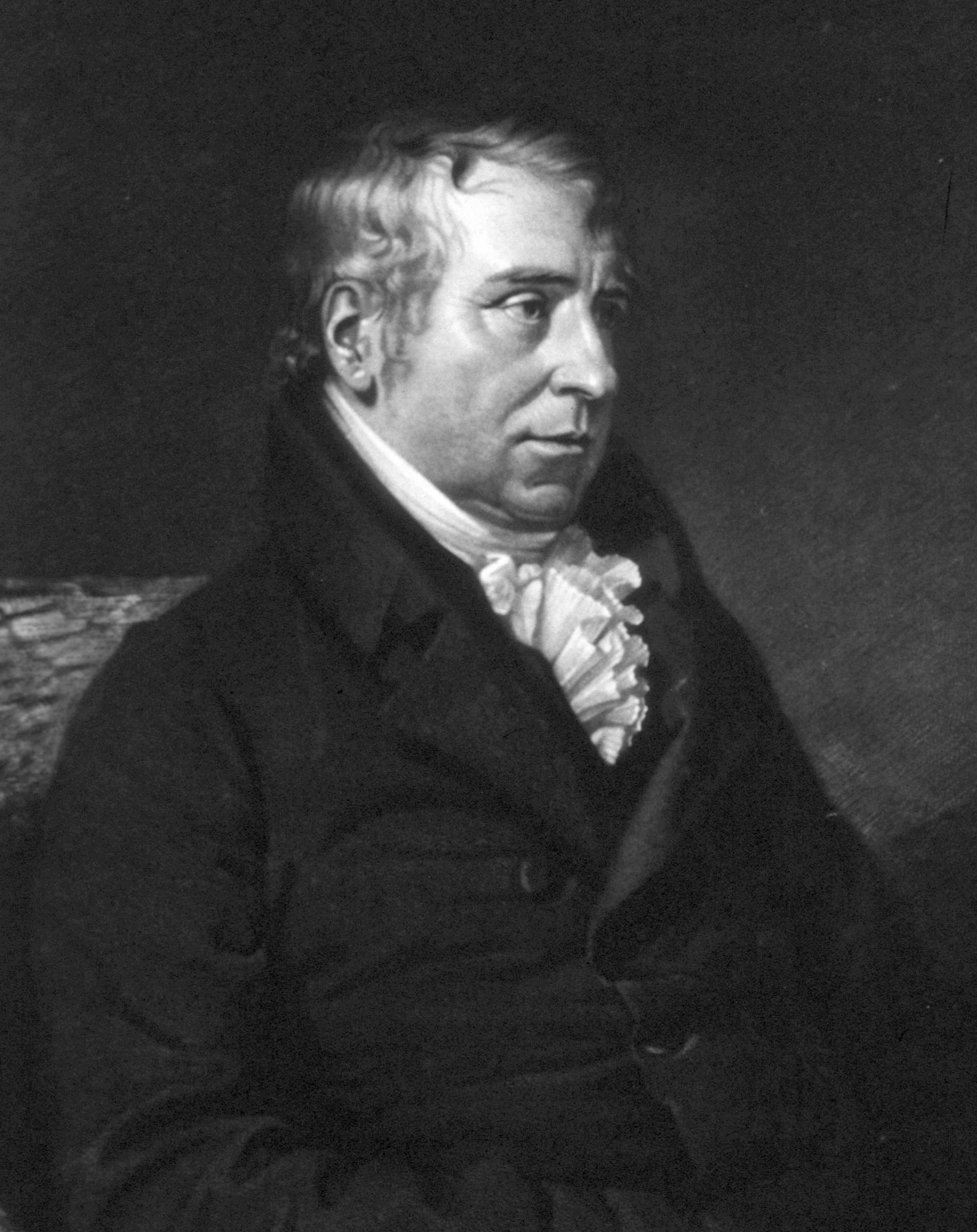
John Haslam, engraving by Henry Dawe after George Dawe.

John Haslam (1764–1844) was an English apothecary, physician and medical writer, known for his work on mental illness. Haslam's case study of James Tilly Matthews is the earliest detailed description of paranoid schizophrenia.

== Life ==
Haslam was born in London, and trained as an apothecary at the United Borough Hospitals, and (briefly) in Edinburgh where he attended medical classes in 1785 and 1786. After acting for many years as apothecary to Bethlehem Hospital, London, and obtaining a practical knowledge of nervous diseases, Haslam was dismissed by the governors in 1816 after the publication of the Report of the Select Committee on Madhouses. He was subsequently created a doctor of medicine by the University of Aberdeen on 17 September 1816.

Haslam rebuilt his career as a physician in London. To comply with the regulations of the College of Physicians in London, he entered himself at Pembroke College, Cambridge, and kept some terms there, but took no degree. He was admitted a licentiate of the College of Physicians on 12 April 1824.

Haslam was distinguished in private practice by his clinical sensitivity, while his scientific publications and contributions to periodicals gave him a solid professional reputation. In an 1809 edition of a work on insanity he included a detailed description of the case of James Tilly Matthews which is one of the earliest and clearest recordings of paranoid schizophrenia. However, in the early years of the nineteenth century, Bethlehem Hospital came to be compared unfavourably with the reformed asylums, notably with The Retreat in York, and with St Luke's under William Battie and his successors. This shift of fashionable opinion reached a decisive conclusion with the Norris scandal of 1815/1816, and Haslam (and, to a lesser extent, Thomas Monro) attracted much of the popular and political obloquy, voiced especially by Edward Wakefield, a Quaker land agent and leading advocate of asylum reform. Although he later retrained as a physician, Haslam was dismissed and financially ruined, and he was forced to sell his entire library. He died at 56 Lamb's Conduit Street, London, 20 July 1844, aged 80.

== Works ==
Haslam wrote:

- Observations on Insanity, with Practical Remarks on the Disease and an Account of the Morbid Appearances on Dissection, 1798. The second edition was entitled Observations on Madness and Melancholy, 1809.
- Illustrations of Madness, with a Description of the Tortures experienced by Bomb-bursting, Lobster-cracking, and Lengthening the Brain, 1810 (for more information see James Tilly Matthews, Illustrations of Madness)
- For Rees's Cyclopædia he contributed the article on Mental derangement, Vol 23, (1812/13)
- Observations of the Physician [i.e. Dr. Thomas Monro] and Apothecary of Bethlem Hospital upon the Evidence before the House of Commons on Madhouses, 1816; Haslam's observations are on pp. 37–55.
- Considerations on the Moral Management of Insane Persons, 1817.
- Medical Jurisprudence as It Relates to Insanity According to the Law of England, 1817.
- A Letter to the Governors of Bethlehem Hospital, containing an Account of their Management for the last Twenty Years, 1818.
- Sound Mind, or Contributions to the History and Physiology of the Human Intellect, 1819.
- A Letter to the Lord Chancellor on Unsoundness of Mind and Imbecility of Intellect, 1823.
- On the Nature of Thought and its Connexion with a Perspicuous Sentence, 1835.

Haslam read three papers—On Restraint and Coercion, 1833, An Attempt to Institute the Correct Discrimination between Crime and Insanity, 1843, and On the Increase of Insanity, 1843—before the Society for Improving the Condition of the Insane; these were printed with others by J. C. Sommers in 1850, in A Selection of the Papers and Prize Essays on Subjects connected with Insanity.
