= Microwave auditory effect =

Concept in human perception of sound

The microwave auditory effect, also known as the microwave hearing effect or the Frey effect, consists of the human perception of sounds induced by pulsed or modulated radio frequencies. The perceived sounds are generated directly inside the human head without the need of any receiving electronic device. The effect was first reported by persons working in the vicinity of radar transponders during World War II. In 1961, the American neuroscientist Allan H. Frey studied this phenomenon and was the first to publish information on the nature of the microwave auditory effect. The cause is thought to be thermoelastic expansion of portions of the auditory apparatus, although competing theories explain the results of holographic interferometry tests differently.

== Research in the U.S. ==
Allan H. Frey was the first American to publish on the microwave auditory effect (MAE). Frey's "Human auditory system response to modulated electromagnetic energy" appeared in the Journal of Applied Physiology in 1961. In his experiments, the subjects were discovered to be able to hear appropriately pulsed microwave radiation, from a distance of a few inches to hundreds of feet from the transmitter. In Frey's tests, a repetition rate of 50 Hz was used, with pulse width between 10–70 microseconds. The perceived loudness was found to be linked to the peak power density, instead of average power density. At 1.245 GHz, the peak power density for perception was below 80 mW/cm^{2}. According to Frey, the induced sounds were described as "a buzz, clicking, hiss, or knocking, depending on several transmitter parameters, i.e., pulse width and pulse-repetition rate". By changing transmitter parameters, Frey was able to induce the "perception of severe buffeting of the head, without such apparent vestibular symptoms as dizziness or nausea". Other transmitter parameters induced a pins and needles sensation. Frey experimented with nerve-deaf subjects, and speculated that the human detecting mechanism was in the cochlea, but at the time of the experiment the results were inconclusive due to factors such as tinnitus.

Auditory sensations of clicking or buzzing have been reported by some workers at modern-day microwave transmitting sites that emit pulsed microwave radiation. Auditory responses to transmitted frequencies from approximately 200 MHz to at least 3 GHz have been reported. The cause is thought to be thermoelastic expansion of portions of auditory apparatus, and the generally accepted mechanism is rapid (but minuscule, in the range of 10^{−5} °C) heating of the brain by each pulse, and the resulting pressure wave traveling through the skull to the cochlea.

In 1975, an article by neuropsychologist Don Justesen discussing radiation effects on human perception referred to an experiment by Joseph C. Sharp and Mark Grove at the Walter Reed Army Institute of Research during which Sharp and Grove reportedly were able to recognize nine out of ten words transmitted by "voice modulated microwaves". Although it's been reported that "power levels required for transmitting sound... [would cause] brain damage due to... thermal effects", the pops associated with the microwave audio effect are not sustained over time, and the effect is due to brief, sudden increases in temperature. In 1961, Frey reported the threshold levels for the microwave audio effect of 267 mW/cm² to be at 1.3 GHz and 5000 mW/cm² at 2.9 GHz for the peak amplitude (providing the pops), respectively. They would only give an average (sustained) power density of only about 0.4 mW/cm² and 2 mW/cm², respectively, similar to current cellphones. However, it's been argued that despite waves the microwave auditory effect only constituting a rapid 10^{−6} °C rise in temperature, for threshold peaks on each pulse, that, at the least, a strong peak of around 1400 kW/cm² (1.4 billion mW/cm²) would certainly be harmful due to the resulting pressure wave.

== Electronic warfare ==
In 2003–2004, WaveBand Corp. had a contract from the U.S. Navy for the design of an MAE system they called MEDUSA (Mob Excess Deterrent Using Silent Audio) that was intended to temporarily incapacitate personnel through remote application. Reportedly, Sierra Nevada Corp. took over the contract from WaveBand. Experts, such as Kenneth Foster, a University of Pennsylvania bioengineering professor who published research on the microwave auditory effect in 1974, have discounted the effectiveness of the proposed device. Foster said that because of human biophysics, the device "would kill you well before you were bothered by the noise". According to former professor at the University of Washington Bill Guy, "There's a misunderstanding by the public and even some scientists about this auditory effect," and "there couldn't possibly be a hazard from the sound, because the heat would get you first".

Microwave effects have been proposed as the cause of otherwise unexplained illnesses of U.S. diplomats in Cuba and China occurring since 2017 and 2018. However, this explanation has been debated. Bioengineer Kenneth R. Foster noted of the health effects observed in the diplomats, "it's crazy, but it's sure as heck not microwaves." As of October 2021, a microwave cause remains one of the major hypotheses.

== Conspiracy theories ==
Numerous individuals suffering from auditory hallucinations, delusional disorders, or other mental illnesses have claimed that government agents use forms of mind control technologies based on microwave signals to transmit sounds and thoughts into their heads as a form of electronic harassment, referring to the alleged technology as "voice to skull" or "V2K".

There are extensive online support networks and numerous websites operated by people fearing mind control. Mental health professionals maintain that many of these websites exhibit evidence of delusional disorders, although they are divided over whether such sites reinforce mental troubles, or act as a form of group social support.

Psychologists have identified many examples of people reporting 'mind control experiences' (MCEs) on self-published web pages that are "highly likely to be influenced by delusional beliefs". Common themes include "Bad Guys" using "psychotronics" and "microwaves", frequent mention of the CIA's MKULTRA project, and frequent citing of Frey's 1962 paper entitled "Human auditory system response to modulated electromagnetic energy".

== See also ==
- Cosmic ray visual phenomena
- Electroreception
- Electrophonic sounds
- Havana syndrome
- Photoacoustic effect
- Sound from ultrasound
- Specific absorption rate – government standards for measurement of human radio frequency exposures
