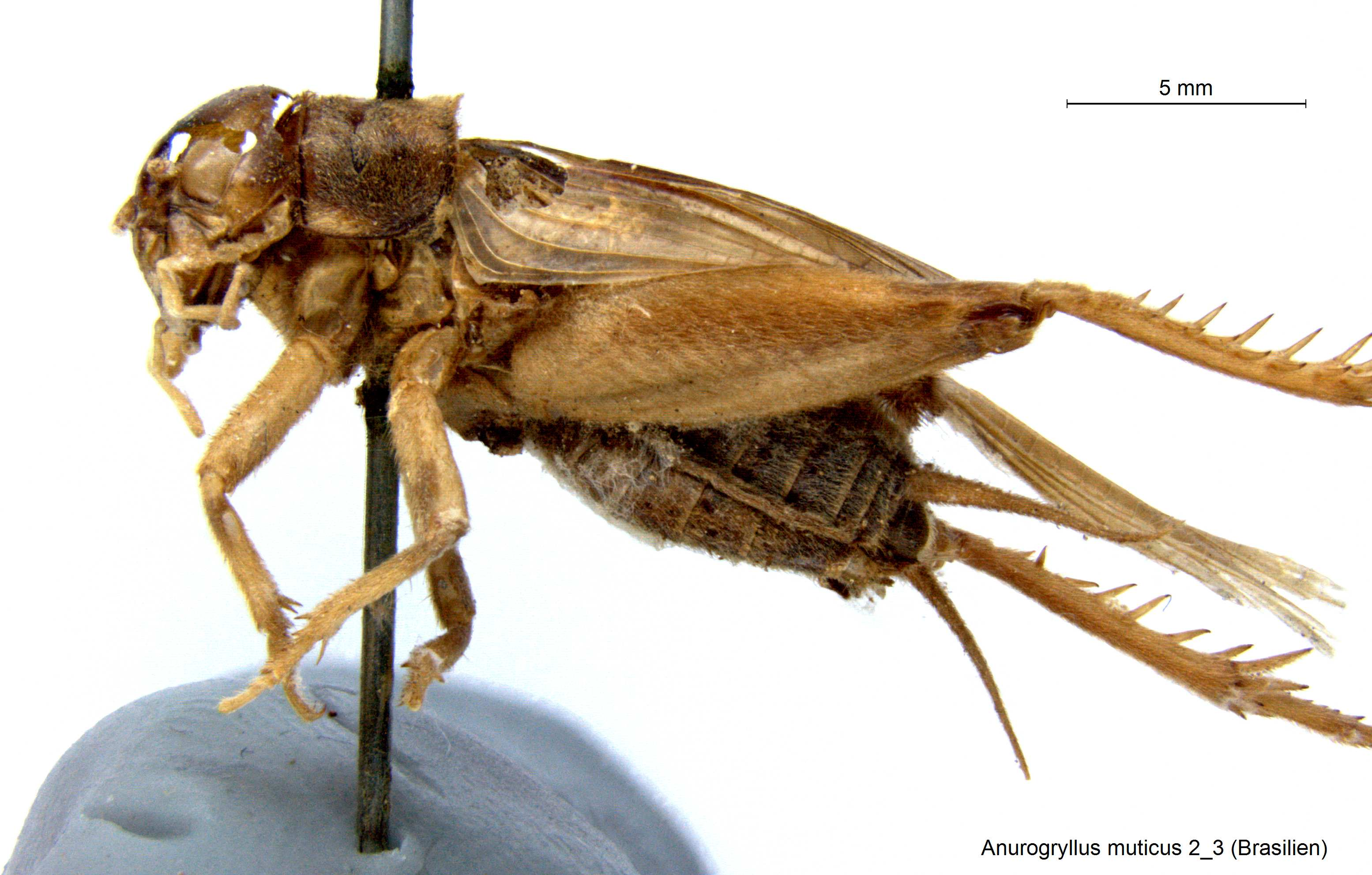
- Anurogryllus muticus

Scientific classification
- Kingdom: Animalia
- Phylum: Arthropoda
- Class: Insecta
- Order: Orthoptera
- Suborder: Ensifera
- Family: Gryllidae
- Subfamily: Gryllinae
- Tribe: Gryllini
- Genus: Anurogryllus; Saussure, 1877

Species
- See text

= Anurogryllus =

Genus of crickets

Anurogryllus, commonly known as short-tailed crickets, is a genus of crickets in the tribe Gryllini; species are recorded from the Americas. The common and scientific names derive from the vestigial, poorly developed ovipositors of females.

== Species ==
The Global Biodiversity Information Facility lists the following species:

- Anurogryllus abortivus (Saussure, 1874)
- Anurogryllus amolgos Otte & Perez-Gelabert, 2009
- Anurogryllus annae Otte & Perez-Gelabert, 2009
- Anurogryllus antillarum (Saussure, 1874)
- Anurogryllus arboreus Walker, 1973
- Anurogryllus australis Saussure, 1877
- Anurogryllus beebei Otte & Perez-Gelabert, 2009
- Anurogryllus brevicaudatus Saussure, 1877
- Anurogryllus caraibeus (Saussure, 1874)
- Anurogryllus carinatus Gorochov, 2019
- Anurogryllus celerinictus Walker, 1973
- Anurogryllus clarazianus (Saussure, 1874)
- Anurogryllus cubensis (Rehn, 1937)
- Anurogryllus ecphylos Otte, 2006
- Anurogryllus edithsantosus Cadena-Castañeda, 2021
- Anurogryllus ellops Otte & Perez-Gelabert, 2009
- Anurogryllus forcipatus (Saussure, 1897)
- Anurogryllus fulvaster (Chopard, 1956)
- Anurogryllus fulvastrus (Chopard, 1956)
- Anurogryllus fuscus Caudell, 1913
- Anurogryllus gnomus Otte & Perez-Gelabert, 2009
- Anurogryllus hierroi Otte & Perez-Gelabert, 2009
- Anurogryllus mataracu Gorochov, 2019
- Anurogryllus matheticos Otte, 2006
- Anurogryllus minimus Gorochov, 2019
- Anurogryllus muticus (De Geer, 1773)
- Anurogryllus nerthus Otte & Perez-Gelabert, 2009
- Anurogryllus nigua Otte & Perez-Gelabert, 2009
- Anurogryllus nyctinomos Otte & Perez-Gelabert, 2009
- Anurogryllus oaxaca Gorochov, 2019
- Anurogryllus pantanal Gorochov, 2019
- Anurogryllus parvispeculum Gorochov, 2019
- Anurogryllus patos Redü, 2017
- Anurogryllus tamaulipas Gorochov, 2019
- Anurogryllus tapes Redü, 2017
- Anurogryllus toledopizai (de Mello, 1988)
- Anurogryllus toltecus (Saussure, 1874)
- Anurogryllus typhlos Otte & Peck, 1998
- Anurogryllus vanescens Otte & Perez-Gelabert, 2009
- Anurogryllus vibrans Otte & Perez-Gelabert, 2009
