= Moscow Signal =

Microwave radiation incident

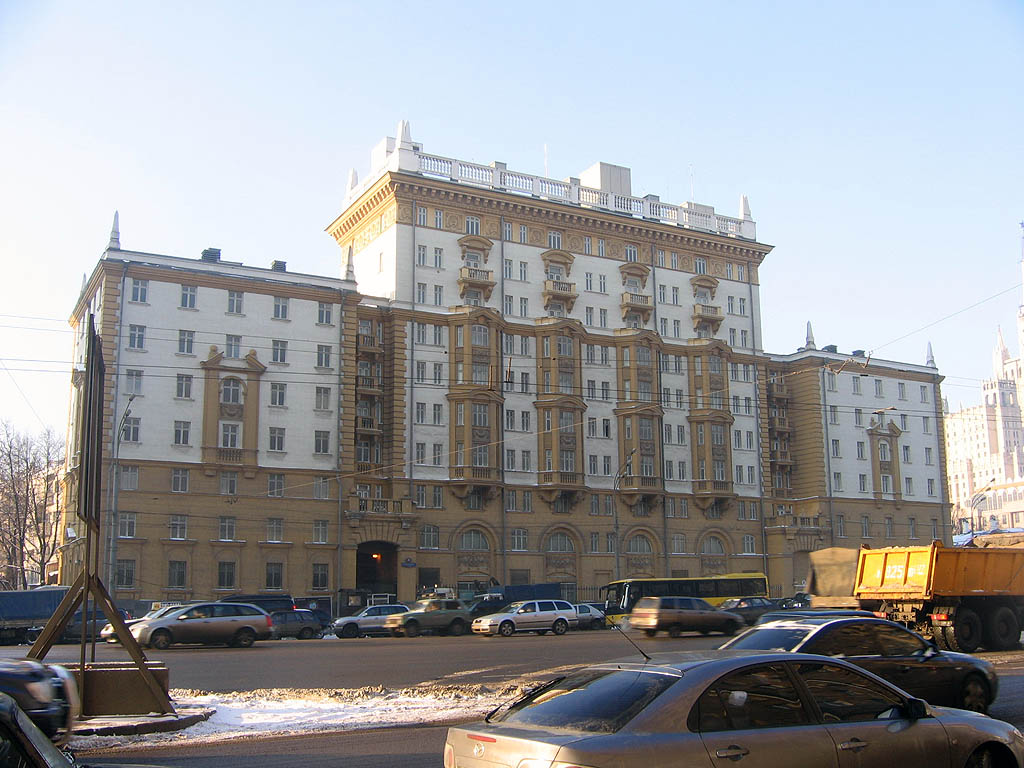
United States Embassy, Moscow

The Moscow Signal was a reported microwave transmission varying between 2.5 and 4 gigahertz, directed at the U.S. Embassy in Moscow from 1953 to 1976, resulting in an international incident. There were no significant health effects on embassy staff, although this conclusion has been disputed.

== Background ==
The name "Moscow Signal" was used by United States intelligence officials to describe the low power signals recorded in the embassy. The microwave transmissions caused an irradiance in the embassy of only 5 μW/cm^{2}, which is one-thousandth the maximum permissible leakage from a microwave oven and far below what would be needed to heat anything. However, these signals were a hundred times more powerful than the Soviet Union's maximum exposure standards, which caused concern among U.S. officials.

The microwave beam came from a source in an apartment building about 100 metres (109 yards) east of the 10-floor embassy building. The beams targeted the east side of the building, with highest intensities between the third and eighth floors.

During routine background radiation testing in 1953, the microwaves were detected and sourced to suspected Soviet forces. Eleven years later, shielding against the microwaves was eventually put into place. During regular monitoring of the signal, the beams were found to have increased in intensity in 1975. The discovery of these microwaves was not acknowledged to the public or many embassy personnel until February 1976.

Theories as to the signal's purpose include electronic jamming and a popular (although unproven) idea that the technology was used to interfere with the health, minds or behavior of the American embassy staff.

== Health studies ==
=== United States human testing ===
In minutes from a May 12, 1969, meeting, the DARPA Pandora scientific committee discussed plans to move forward with eight human subjects. The human subjects would be exposed to the Moscow Signal and then given a full battery of medical and psychological tests. The committee did recommend "gonadal protection be provided" to the male test subjects, however, human testing was not pursued. The program was shut down in 1969, with an effect of the signal on behavior and/or biological functions deemed "too subtle or insignificant to be evident".

=== Moscow embassy study ===
In 1976, after the microwave radiation was found to have increased, the U.S. Department of State commissioned a study led by Abraham Lilienfeld, assisted by the Department of Epidemiology at Johns Hopkins University. The goal of the study was to compare the Moscow embassy staff and their families with the staff and families associated with other eastern European U.S. embassies, who would have shared many similarities in their daily life. The exposed group were staff who had worked at the Moscow embassy from January 1, 1953, to June 30, 1976, and their families in Moscow; and the comparison group was individuals in other selected Eastern European embassies during the identical timeframe, and their families. While the study was unpublished, its 1978 report concluded that there were no adverse health effects.

A Spanish study in 2019, based on the 1978 study with declassified information and new statistical analyses, found that Moscow embassy employees in 1976 had a higher cancer mortality rate than the general population and a worse health status than Europe's embassy employees overall.

=== Suspected health impacts ===
Ambassador Walter Stoessel fell ill in 1975 with symptoms including bleeding from the eyes. He later died of leukemia. In a 1975 phone call US Secretary of State Henry Kissinger linked Stoessel's illness to the microwaves and stated "we are trying to keep the thing quiet". Multiple other ambassadors and embassy staff died of cancer, but there has never been any scientifically plausible link demonstrated between non-ionizing radiation and elevated cancer risk.

== Relation to the Cold War ==
=== Technological advancement ===
The Moscow Signal was used during the period of the Cold War commonly referred to as "Confrontation Through Détente". The signal is just one example of the new technologies developed during the Cold War to be used to spy on other countries without needing a human intelligence agent. Cold War espionage was ruthless and drastically changed international relations.

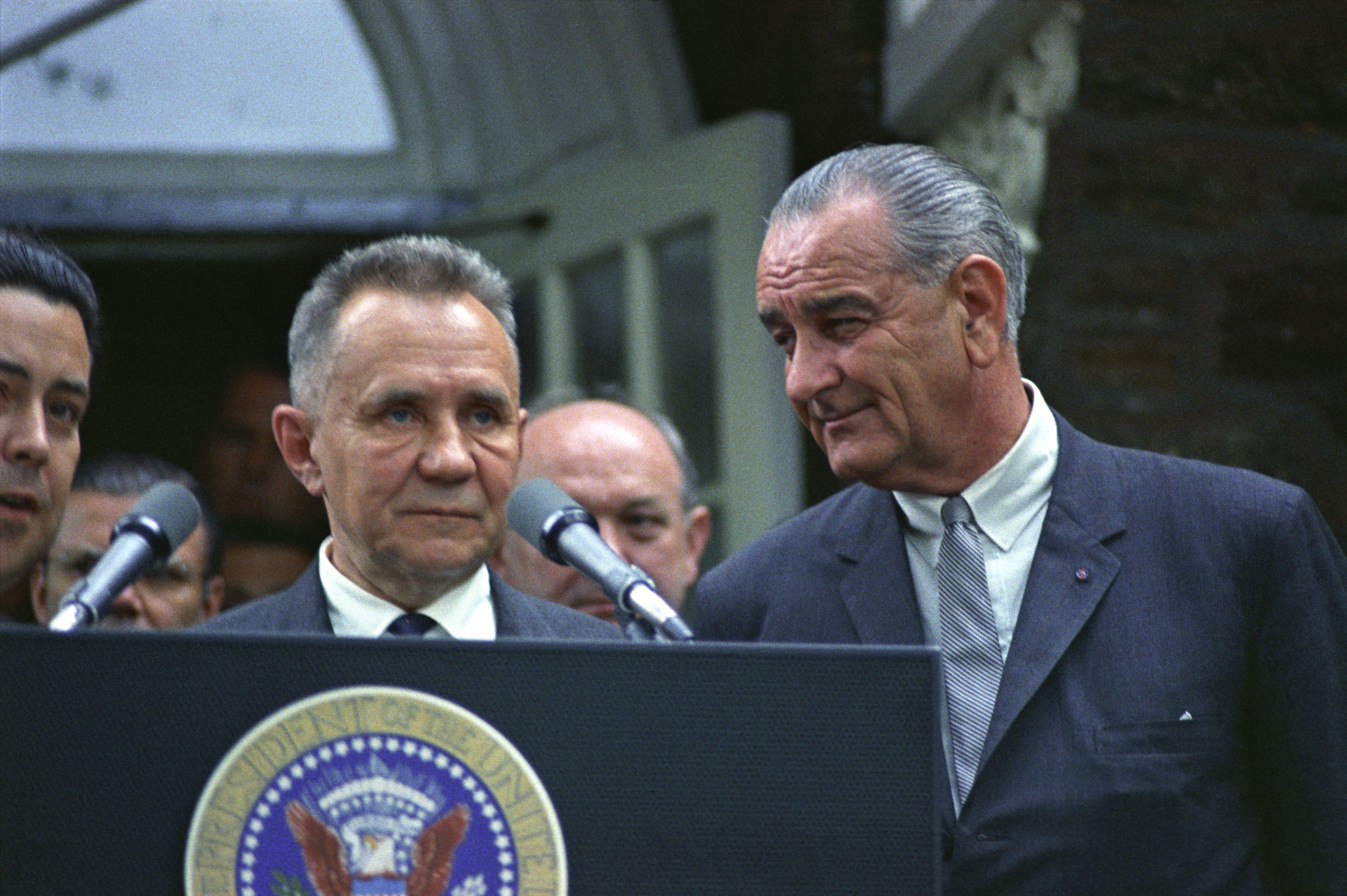
Alexei Kosygin with U.S. President Lyndon B. Johnson at the summit.

=== The Glassboro Summit of 1967 ===
The Glassboro Summit Conference was held in June 1967. It was a meeting of President Lyndon B. Johnson and Premier Alexei Kosygin, leaders of the United States government and Soviet government, respectively, for the purpose of discussing Soviet Union–United States relations. It was held in Glassboro, New Jersey. During the course of this meeting, the United States made several protests to the Kremlin over the use of microwave technology. However, the protests were unsuccessful as the microwave technology was used on the United States embassy in Moscow for several years to come.

== See also ==
- Yellow rain
- Havana syndrome
- The Thing (listening device)
