= Francis E. Dec =

American outsider writer (1926–1996)

Francis Edward Dec
- Dec in 1958
- Born: January 6, 1926; Hempstead, New York
- Died: January 21, 1996 (aged 70); Queens, New York
- Resting place: Calvary Cemetery, Queens, New York
- Occupations: Legal research; outsider writer

Francis Edward Dec (/dɛk/ DEK; Polish: [dɛt͡s] DETZ; January 6, 1926 – January 21, 1996) was an American lawyer best known for typewritten diatribes that he independently mailed and published from the late 1960s until his death. His works are characterized by conspiracy theories and highly accusatory and vulgar attacks, often making use of conglomerate phrases like "Mad Deadly Worldwide Communist Gangster Computer God" to slander people, groups, or companies that he believed were engaging in electronic harassment against him, and gained a cult following from the mid-1980s onward due to his incoherence. He has additionally been described as an outsider writer in the field of outsider literature.

== Biography ==
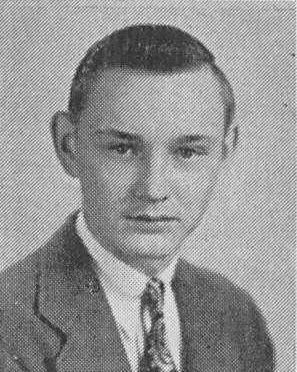
Francis E. Dec in high school, 1944

Four billion worldwide population—all living—have a Computer God Containment Policy Brain Bank Brain, a real brain, in the Brain Bank Cities on the far side of the moon we never see. Primarily based on your lifelong Frankenstein Radio Controls, especially your Eyesight tv sight-and-sound recorded by your brain, your moon-brain of the Computer God activates your Frankenstein threshold Brainwash Radio—lifelong inculcating conformist propaganda.

— Francis E. Dec, quoted in The Technical Delusion: Electronics, Power, Insanity by Jeffrey Sconce

Francis E. Dec was born in New York on January 6, 1926. In early 1944, during the Second World War, he enlisted into the United States Army with the rank of private. He remained within the United States for the duration of the war, periodically moving between bases, at one point being assigned to Yuma Army Air Station.

After the war, Dec entered into law, but was disbarred by the state of New York in 1958 and proceeded to make numerous "incoherent" legal appeals, including an appeal to the Supreme Court. He was admitted to a psychiatric hospital for 60 days in 1961 and in 1965 attempted to flee his home in Hempstead, New York for Poland. Dec spent the next 25 years writing and distributing lengthy screeds about the "Worldwide Communist Gangster Computer God" and its conspiracy to control the world through electronic mind control devices which he referred to as "Frankenstein Radio Controls." These flyers were mailed to radio and television stations across the United States. According to Dec, the Worldwide Communist Gangster Computer God was the product of an ancient Polish (Slavonic) civilization which it subsequently drove to near-extinction. He was also antisemitic, seeing the Jews as the Computer God's pawns. In his writing, he blamed the Holocaust and Nazism on the Jews, and preceded the names of the Nazi Party members with "Jew" (example: Jew Adolf Hitler; Nazi JEW Hans Frank). He asserted that the belief that Jews were victims of the Holocaust was based on misinformation from "Hollywood movies".

== Analysis ==
Jeffrey Sconce analyzed the written works of Francis E. Dec in his book The Technical Delusion: Electronics, Power, Insanity, within a chapter discussing the phenomenon of targeted individuals. In it, he argues that "his writing speaks to a feature of technical delusions that became increasingly prominent in the second half of the twentieth century." Sconce also states that "Dec's screeds are emblematic in their careening, amplified panic over imperious yet chimerical powers that seemingly are everywhere all the time and yet can never be fully confronted or understood."

== Legacy ==
Dec gained a cult following in the 1980s, becoming infamous through the KROQ-FM newscaster Boyd Britton's widely circulated dramatic readings of his rants, and figures interested in Dec's works included William S. Burroughs and Genesis P-Orridge; the latter used a recording of reading Dec's rants on the Psychic TV album Ultrahouse (The L.A. Connection). A 1983 issue of the comics anthology Weirdo reprinted a page of Dec's writings, and the collective Radiohole, consisting of Eric Dyer, Scott Gillette and Maggie Hoffman, created a stage play inspired by Dec, titled A History of Heen (not Francis E. Dec Esq.) in 1999.

== See also ==
- Frank Chu
- James Tilly Matthews, an English tea broker who claimed to be tormented by an "air loom".
- Jovan I. Deretić, a Serbian pseudohistorian known for his theories of exaggerated importance of Serbs in world history
- Persecutory delusion
- Tartary
- Terry A. Davis
