= Peter Zimmerman =

American nuclear physicist (1941–2021)

Peter D. Zimmerman (June 15, 1941, Portsmouth, Virginia – August 27, 2021 Washington, D. C.) was an American nuclear physicist, arms control expert, and former chief scientist of the Senate Foreign Relations Committee. At his death, he was emeritus professor of science and security at King's College London. He retired from the college in August 2008 and was named professor emeritus on 1 September of the same year.

== Biography ==
Peter D. Zimmerman was born in Portsmouth, Virginia, on 15 June 1941. He graduated from Stanford University in 1963 with a Bachelor of Science degree. He earned a Filosofie Licentiat degree at Lund University in 1967 and a Ph.D. at Stanford University in 1969. All degrees are in experimental nuclear and elementary particle physics.

Zimmerman was elected a Fellow of the American Physical Society in 1988.

Zimmerman worked several times at the Arms Control and Disarmament Agency until the agency was folded into U.S. Department of State, and worked closely with other physicists there such as David S. Wollan. He was Science Advisor for ACDA at the time it was merged into the Department of State in March 1999. He then became Science Adviser for Arms Control in the U.S. Department of State. After the election of George W. Bush as president, Zimmerman left the State Department and then served as the chief scientist of the Senate Foreign Relations Committee from August 2001 until January 2003 and as Democratic chief scientist until March 2004.

In 2004, Zimmerman became professor of science and security in the department of war studies at King's College London.

== Awards and honors ==
- 2004 Joseph A. Burton Forum Award recipient
