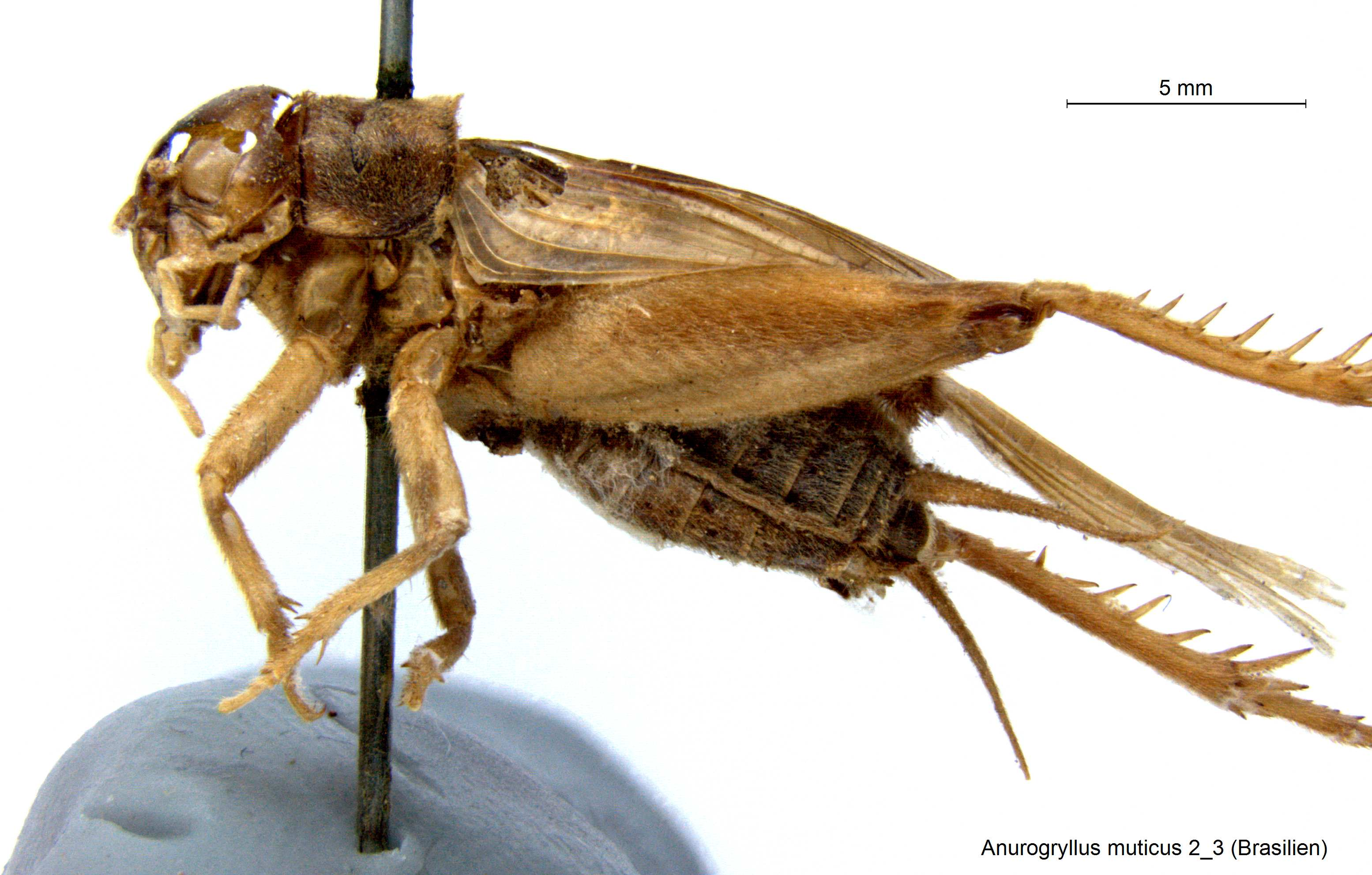

Scientific classification
- Kingdom: Animalia
- Phylum: Arthropoda
- Class: Insecta
- Order: Orthoptera
- Suborder: Ensifera
- Family: Gryllidae
- Genus: Anurogryllus
- Species: A. muticus

Binomial name
- Anurogryllus muticus (De Geer, 1773)

Synonyms
- A. angustulus (Walker, 1869); A. clarazianus (Saussure, 1874); A. comptus (Walker, 1869); A. guadaloupensis (Fabricius, 1793)

= Anurogryllus muticus =

Species of cricket

Anurogryllus muticus, also known as De Geer's short-tailed cricket or simply short-tailed cricket (a name common to many Anurogryllus species) is a species of cricket in the family Gryllidae.

It is native to Bermuda, the West Indies, Central and South America. It is nocturnal and hides in a burrow by day.

== Taxonomy ==
At one time, nearly all the short-tailed crickets in the United States were considered to belong to the species Anurogryllus muticus, the range of which extended from Canada to much of South America. In a revision of the genus made by T. Walker in 1973, Anurogryllus arboreus was split off on the basis of the calling behavior of the male, and on certain morphological differences. The range of A. muticus is now considered to include Bermuda, the West Indies, Central and South America as far south as southern Brazil while that of A. arboreus covers much of the continental United States.

There are two subspecies; A. muticus caraibeus (Saussure, 1874) is found in the West Indies, the type locality being Saint Thomas, U.S. Virgin Islands, and A. muticus muticus (De Geer, 1773) which is found in Central and South America, the type locality being Suriname.

== Description ==
Anurogryllus muticus is a small, pale brown cricket with a very short ovipositor. The adults have wings, which is in contrast to A. arboreus which sheds its wings soon after maturing.

== Behavior ==
Anurogryllus muticus is nocturnal, concealing itself in a burrow during the day. It forages at night and carries food into the burrow to side-chambers which it excavates. The entrance to the burrow is normally kept plugged except when its owner is outside. Its preferred food seems to be the clover Alysicarpus vaginalis and the burrow is often constructed close to this food source. This is particularly advantageous for females, which forage on this plant before egg-laying, transport time being minimised by its close proximity.

Males of A. muticus call to attract a mate; the call is made during much of the night which is in contrast to A. arboreus which only calls for a period of two to three hours shortly after sunset. Much energy is expended on calling and although the cricket metabolises both carbohydrates and lipids when at rest, while calling it mostly metabolises the lipids which have been stored in the testes.
