= Electrophonic sounds =

Electrophonic sounds are sounds heard far away from—and produced indirectly by—an event such as a meteor or possibly an aurora. They are notable because, unlike normal sounds from distant phenomena, they can be heard almost immediately, at the same time the event is visible.

The shock wave from a meteor entering the atmosphere propagates at the speed of sound, so would not ordinarily be audible to distant observers, such as those on the Earth’s surface, at the same time that the meteor is visible. However, some meteors also produce very- or extremely-low frequency radio waves that can induce electrical currents in nearby objects. These currents can induce vibration, resulting in audible vibrations reaching an observer at approximately the same time as the light from the meteor.

Electrophonic sound has also been reported accompanying the re-entry of artificial satellites, and have been proposed as the explanation for reports by indigenous people of audible aurora.

== See also ==
- Electroreception — evolved perception of electrical stimuli
- Microwave auditory effect – in which microwave radiation directly stimulates ears
