= Anurogryllus celerinictus =

Scientific classification
- Domain: Eukaryota
- Kingdom: Animalia
- Phylum: Arthropoda
- Class: Insecta
- Order: Orthoptera
- Suborder: Ensifera
- Family: Gryllidae
- Genus: Anurogryllus
- Species: A. celerinictus

Binomial name
- Anurogryllus celerinictus Walker, 1973

Species of cricket

Anurogryllus celerinictus, the Indies short-tailed cricket, is a species of cricket in the family Gryllidae. It was described in 1973 by Thomas J. Walker.

In January 2019, the noise from its song was proposed as the cause of the Havana syndrome. A JASON report from November 2018 (declassified in September 2021) concluded that sounds recorded during investigations of Havana syndrome most likely came from A. celerinictus.
