= David S. Wollan =

David S. Wollan (March 14, 1937 – August 25, 2008) was an American physicist and arms control specialist.

Wollan was born in Massachusetts, attended Amherst College as an undergraduate physics major, and earned his Master's and Ph.D. in physics at the University of Illinois in Urbana. He was a Fellow of the American Physical Society.

After earning his Ph.D. in 1966, Wollan was an assistant professor of physics at Virginia Polytechnic Institute where he did research on electron and nuclear magnetic resonance of rare earth ionic crystals. In 1974, he went to the U.S. Arms Control and Disarmament Agency (ACDA) as a physical science officer, and served on U.S. delegations to SALT II and START negotiations. He spent a great deal of time in Geneva on negotiations in those years, and met his second wife, Barbara, there. In 1980 he was selected to attend the National War College, and was a distinguished graduate there in 1981. In 1989, he was made chief of the Theater and Strategic Defense Division of ACDA, the office responsible for the ABM Treaty and related issues. He held similar positions and responsibilities after ACDA was merged into the State Department in 1999. He evolved the role of his office to include development of shared early warning protocols with many foreign countries and the exploration of international "rules of the road" for space operations. He retired from government service in 2008. He died on August 25, 2008, from lung cancer.

Wollan was a significant contributor to the major arms control treaties of the Cold War. In particular, he was responsible for developing technical definitions for key terms in the treaties, such as what constitutes a "cruise missile" for purposes of treaty limitations. In 1998, he was made a Fellow of the American Physical Society "for leadership in the arms control of both offensive and defensive strategic arms, combining deep technical analysis with legal and diplomatic expertise regarding the SALT II, START I, and ABM treaties."
