= MEDUSA (weapon) =

Directed-energy non-lethal weapon

MEDUSA (Mob Excess Deterrent Using Silent Audio) is a directed-energy non-lethal weapon designed by WaveBand Corporation in 2003–2004 for temporary personnel incapacitation. The weapon is based on the microwave auditory effect resulting in a strong sound sensation in the human head when it is subject to certain kinds of pulsed/modulated microwave radiation. The developers claimed that through the combination of pulse parameters and pulse power, it is possible to raise the auditory sensation to a "discomfort" level, deterring personnel from entering a protected perimeter or, if necessary, temporarily incapacitating particular individuals. In 2005, Sierra Nevada Corporation acquired WaveBand Corporation.

== Description ==
According to the U.S. Navy in 2004, the system would be "portable, low power, have a controllable radius of coverage, be able to switch from crowd to individual coverage, cause a temporarily incapacitating effect, have a low probability of fatality or permanent injury, cause no damage to property, and have a low probability of affecting friendly personnel". In addition to perimeter protection and crowd control, a proposed application of MEDUSA was "for use in systems to assist communication with hearing impaired persons".

== Fate ==
The project received a positive initial evaluation from the Navy. However, Sierra Nevada Corporation had discontinued the project as of 2008, "possibly because it may have [been] shown to permanently damage human brain tissue".

== See also ==
- Sonic weaponry
