= James Tilly Matthews =

British merchant (1770–1815)

- Born: 1770
- Died: 10 January 1815 (aged 44 or 45)
- Occupation: Merchant
- Known for: Considered first fully documented case of schizophrenia

James Tilly Matthews (1770 – 10 January 1815) was a British merchant who was committed to the Bethlem Royal Hospital in 1797 after developing politically charged delusions which led him to disrupt sessions of the House of Commons of Great Britain. These delusions were documented in an 1810 book titled Illustrations of Madness, including Matthews' belief that a group of spies were using an "air loom" to secretly torment him from a distance. Modern historians consider Matthews to be the first fully documented case of schizophrenia.

== Life ==
=== Voyage to France ===
In the early 1790s, concerned at the likelihood of war between Britain and France, Matthews travelled to France with the radical David Williams, who was acquainted with such Girondins as Jacques Pierre Brissot and Charles-François Lebrun. Williams made efforts at mediation which failed, whereupon Matthews took the lead. He gained the trust of the French government for a short time.

On 2 June 1793 the Girondists were displaced by the Jacobins and Matthews fell under suspicion for his Girondist associations and also because he was suspected of being a double agent. He was arrested and imprisoned for three years during the height of The Terror and was reportedly terrified of the guillotine, like all others. This lasted until 1796 when the French authorities concluded that he was a lunatic and released him.

=== Committal ===
Returning to London, Matthews wrote two letters to Lord Liverpool, in which he accused the Home Secretary of treason and complained about conspiracies directed against his life. After interrupting a debate in the House of Commons by shouting "Treason" at Lord Liverpool from the Public Gallery, he was arrested and held at Tothill Fields Bridewell, a secure house of correction in Tothill Fields, Westminster before being admitted to the Bethlem (Bedlam) hospital on 28 January 1797. Upon examination he declared that he had taken part in secret affairs of state (referring to his efforts in France), but had been betrayed and abandoned by William Pitt's administration.

In 1809 his family and friends petitioned for his release, on the grounds that he was no longer insane, but their petition was rejected by the Bethlem authorities. They therefore took out a suit of habeas corpus and two doctors, George Birkbeck and Henry Clutterbuck examined Matthews, declaring him sane. John Haslam, the resident apothecary at Bethlem, begged to differ and maintained that Matthews' delusions, particularly on political matters, rendered him a danger both to public figures and the general public.

=== Illustrations of Madness ===
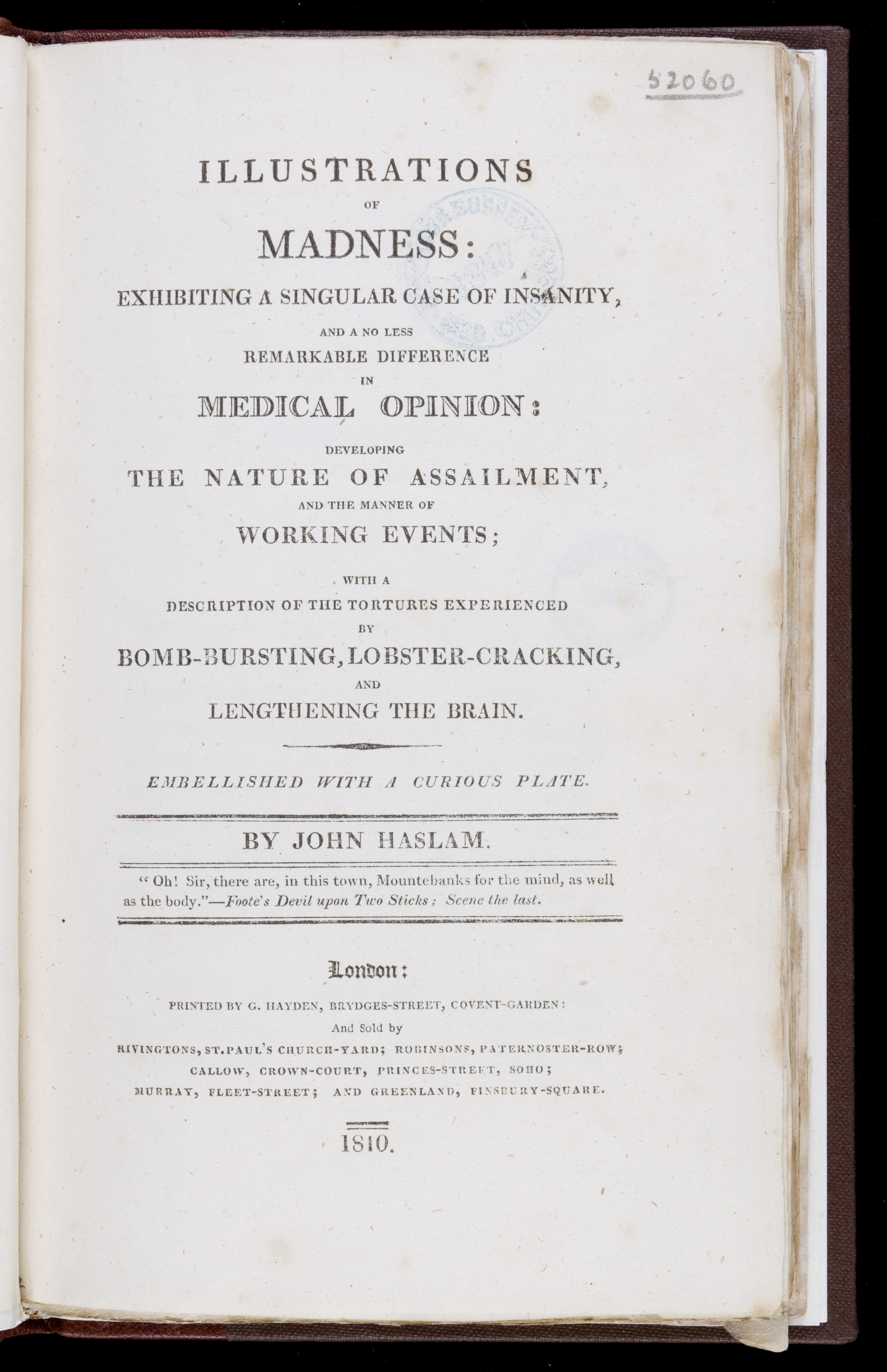
Title page

In 1810 John Haslam produced the book Illustrations of Madness (original title: Illustrations of Madness: Exhibiting a Singular Case of Insanity, And a No Less Remarkable Difference in Medical Opinions: Developing the Nature of An Assailment, And the Manner of Working Events; with a Description of Tortures Experienced by Bomb-Bursting, Lobster-Cracking and Lengthening the Brain. Embellished with a Curious Plate). Haslam intended to settle the dispute over Matthews' sanity; his book contains verbatim accounts of Matthew's beliefs and hallucinatory experiences and is considered the original description of the symptoms of paranoid schizophrenia. The book documented the first full study of a single psychiatric patient in medical history and has become a classic in the medical literature.

=== The "Air Loom" ===
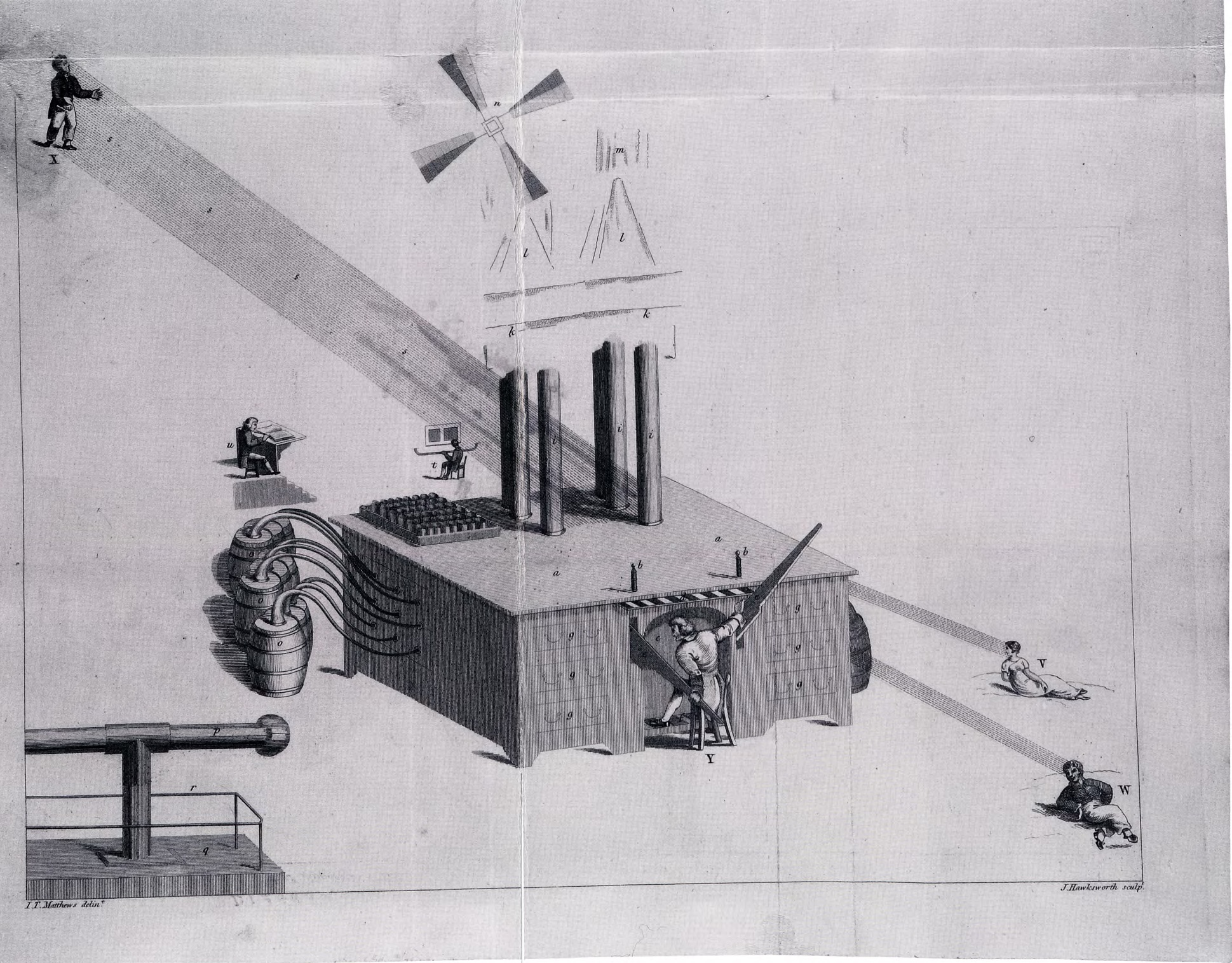
Matthews's illustration of the Air Loom

Matthews believed that a gang of criminals and spies skilled in pneumatic chemistry had taken up residence at London Wall in Moorfields (close to Bethlem) and were tormenting him by means of rays emitted by a machine called the "Air Loom" or gaseous charge generator. The torments induced by the rays included "Lobster-cracking", during which the circulation of the blood was prevented by a magnetic field; "Stomach-skinning" and "Apoplexy-working with the nutmeg grater" which involved the introduction of fluids into the skull. His persecutors bore such names as "the Middleman" (who operated the Air Loom), "the Glove Woman" and "Sir Archy" (who acted as "repeaters" or "active worriers" to enhance Matthews' torment or record the machine's activities) and their leader, a man called "Bill, or the King".

Matthews' delusions had a definite political slant: he claimed that the purpose of this gang was espionage, and that there were many other such gangs armed with Air Looms all over London, using "pneumatic practitioners" to "premagnetize" potential victims with "volatile magnetic fluid". According to Matthews, their chief targets (apart from himself) were leading government figures. By means of their "rays" they could influence ministers' thoughts and read their minds. Matthews declared that William Pitt was "not half" susceptible to these attacks and held that these gangs were responsible for the British military disasters at Buenos Aires in 1807 and Walcheren in 1809 and also for the Nore Mutiny of 1797.

In 1814 Matthews was moved to "Fox's London House", a private asylum in Hackney, where he became a popular and trusted patient. His delusions appeared to have stopped. The asylum's owner, Dr. Fox, regarded him as sane. Matthews assisted with bookkeeping and gardening until his death on 10 January 1815.

== Significance of the Air Loom Gang affair ==
Although it is impossible to make an unequivocal diagnosis of a person long since deceased, Matthews' description of his torment by the "Air Loom Gang" reads as a classic example of paranoid persecutory delusions experienced as part of a psychotic episode. From this, it can be concluded that his disorder was most likely schizophrenia, although retrospective diagnoses should be treated with caution. Modern historians consider Matthews to be the first fully documented case of schizophrenia.

While Haslam kept notes on Matthews, Matthews also kept notes on Haslam and his treatment in Bethlem. This formed part of the evidence looked at by the House of Commons 'Committee On the Better Regulation of Madhouses in England' in 1815, the findings of which led to Haslam's dismissal and reform of the treatment of patients in the Bethlem Hospital.

Matthews was also important in the history of psychiatry for more practical reasons. During his involuntary confinement he took part in a public competition to design plans for the rebuilding of Bethlem hospital. Though Matthews did not win the competition, Bethlem's governors thought so well of the 46 pages of designs submitted by Matthews that they gave him £30 (equivalent to £2,040 in 2025) as an ex gratia payment.

== Fictional representations ==
- Haslam's Key, a play written by journalist Danny O'Brien, imagined Matthews as a forerunner of modern science fiction authors. The titular "key" was a wooden spoon-like device invented by John Haslam, the documenter of Matthew's delusions, which was used to force-feed Bedlam patients.
- In 2002, the British artist Rod Dickinson built a re-creation of the air loom from Matthews' original plans.
- Greg Hollingshead's novel Bedlam (2004) concerns the changing relationship between John Haslam and Matthews and is narrated in first-person from the perspective of Haslam, Matthews, and Matthews' wife.
- The CSI episode "Lab Rats" (2007), Grissom uses Matthews' condition as an analogy in describing The Miniature Killer, a serial killer obsessed with bleach.
- Robert Rankin's 2007 novel The Da-da-de-da-da Code features a group of villains known as the Air Loom Gang, as well as a doctor named Doctor Archy, a pub called "The Middle Man" and a beer called "King Billy".
- A short animated film about Matthews was produced by Leo Bridle and Mike Jay in 2014 in collaboration with the Wellcome Collection.
- The game Amnesia: A Machine for Pigs from 2013 makes several references to both James Tilly Matthews, the Air Loom and Bedlam.
- The song "Snake Oil" from Lovejoy's 2026 EP Second to One makes a reference to the Air Loom.

== See also ==
- Francis E. Dec
- Influencing Machine
- Mind control
- Persecutory delusion
