= Electronic harassment =

Delusion regarding mind manipulation by electronic means

Electronic harassment, electromagnetic torture, and psychotronic torture is a conspiracy theory describing the hostile use of mundane electromagnetic devices, such as radio or microwaves, against self-identified "targeted individuals" (TIs). They believe that malicious actors are transmitting sounds and thoughts into people's heads, affecting their bodies, and harassing them generally. The delusion often concerns government agents or crime rings and alleges that the "perpetrators" use electromagnetic radiation (such as the microwave auditory effect), radar, and surveillance techniques to carry out their goals.

Some TIs claim to be victims of gang stalking, and many have created or joined support and advocacy groups.

Multiple medical professionals have concluded that these experiences are hallucinations, the result of delusional disorders, or psychosis.

== Experiences ==
The experiences of people who describe themselves as undergoing electronic harassment using esoteric technology, and who call themselves "targeted individuals" ("T.I."), vary, but experiences often include hearing voices in their heads calling them by name, often mocking them or others around them, as well as physical sensations like burning. They have also described being under physical surveillance by one or more people. Many of these people act and function otherwise normally and included among them are people who are successful in their careers and lives otherwise, and who find these experiences confusing, upsetting, and sometimes shameful, but entirely real. They use news stories, military journals, and declassified national security documents to support their allegations that governments have developed technology that can send voices into people's heads and cause them to feel things. The New York Times estimated that there are more than 10,000 people who self-identify as targeted individuals.

Psychologist Lorraine Sheridan co-authored a study of gang-stalking in the Journal of Forensic Psychiatry & Psychology. According to Sheridan, "One has to think of the T.I. phenomenon in terms of people with paranoid symptoms who have hit upon the gang-stalking idea as an explanation of what is happening to them". Mental health professionals say that T.I.s can experience hallucinations and their explanations of being targeted or harassed arise from delusional disorders or psychosis. Yale psychiatry professor Ralph Hoffman states that people often ascribe voices in their heads to external sources such as government harassment, God, or dead relatives, and it can be difficult to persuade these individuals that their belief in an external influence is delusional. Other experts compare these stories to accounts of alien abductions.

Press accounts have documented individuals who apparently believed they were victims of electronic harassment, and in some cases persuaded courts to agree. In 2008, James Walbert went to court claiming that his former business associate had threatened him with "jolts of radiation" after a disagreement, and later claimed feeling symptoms such as electric shock sensations and hearing strange sounds in his ears. The court decided to issue an order banning "electronic means" to further harass Walbert.

=== Notable crimes ===
Various people who describe themselves as undergoing electronic harassment have committed crimes, notably including a number of mass shootings.

Fuaed Abdo Ahmed, a 20-year-old man, held a man and two women hostage at the Tensas State Bank in St. Joseph, Louisiana on August 13, 2013, eventually killing two of the hostages and himself. A subsequent police investigation officially concluded that Ahmed had paranoid schizophrenia and was hearing voices. Ahmed had accused the family of his ex-girlfriend of implanting a "microphone device" of some kind in his head.

On September 16, 2013, Aaron Alexis fatally shot twelve people and injured three others in the Washington Navy Yard using a shotgun on which he had written "my ELF weapon", before being killed by responding police officers. The FBI concluded that Alexis had "delusional beliefs". These beliefs included that he was being "controlled or influenced by extremely low frequency electromagnetic waves."

On November 20, 2014, Florida State University alumnus Myron May shot and injured three people on the campus and was killed by responding police officers. Before the event, he had become increasingly anxious that he was under government surveillance and heard voices.

Gavin Eugene Long, who killed three police officers and injured three others in Baton Rouge, Louisiana, on July 17, 2016, was a believer in numerous anti-government movements and conspiracy theories, but he was most notably a member of a group dedicated to helping people with "remote brain experimentation, remote neural monitoring of an entire human's body."

Matthew Choi, a 30-year-old South African, who claimed himself under a V2K electronic harassment and made remarks about "being brainwashed through microwave" since 2015, murdered a taxi driver in Hong Kong on October 12, 2021. The case arose mass attention in the city, and the police described him as "extremely dangerous".

== Conspiracy theories ==
Mind control conspiracy advocates believe they have found references to secret weapons in government programs such as "Project Pandora," a DARPA research effort into biological and behavioral effects of microwave radiation commissioned after the Moscow Signal incident, when the U.S. embassy in Moscow was bombarded with microwaves by the Soviets beginning in 1953. It was discovered that the Soviets' intent was eavesdropping and electronic jamming rather than mind control. Project Pandora studied the effects of occupational radiation exposure, and the project's scientific review committee concluded that microwave radiation could not be used for mind control. Conspiracy advocates also frequently cite the 2002 Air Force Research Laboratory patent for using microwaves to send spoken words into someone's head. Although there is no evidence that mind control using microwaves exists, rumors of continued classified research fuel the worries of people who believe they are being targeted.

In 1987, a U.S. National Academy of Sciences report commissioned by the Army Research Institute noted psychotronics as one of the "colorful examples" of claims of psychic warfare that first surfaced in anecdotal descriptions, newspapers, and books during the 1980s. The report cited alleged psychotronic weapons such as a "hyperspatial nuclear howitzer" and beliefs that Russian psychotronic weapons were responsible for Legionnaires' disease and the sinking of the USS Thresher among claims that "range from incredible to the outrageously incredible." The committee observed that although reports and stories as well as imagined potential uses for such weapons by military decision makers exist, "nothing approaching scientific literature supports the claims of psychotronic weaponry."

Psychotronic weapons were reportedly being studied by the Russian Federation during the 1990s with military analyst Lieutenant Colonel Timothy L. Thomas saying in 1998 that there was a strong belief in Russia that weapons for attacking the mind of a soldier were a possibility, although no working devices were reported. In Russia, a group called "Victims of Psychotronic Experimentation" attempted to recover damages from the Federal Security Service during the mid-1990s for alleged infringement of their civil liberties including "beaming rays" at them, putting chemicals in the water, and using magnets to alter their minds. These fears may have been inspired by revelations of secret research into "psychotronic" psychological warfare techniques during the early 1990s, with Vladimir Lopatkin, a State Duma committee member in 1995, surmising "something that was secret for so many years is the perfect breeding ground for conspiracy theories."

In 2012, Russian Defense Minister Anatoly Serdyukov and Prime Minister Vladimir Putin commented on plans to draft proposals for the development of psychotronic weapons. NBC News Science Editor Alan Boyle dismissed notions that such weapons actually existed, saying, "there's nothing in the comments from Putin and Serdyukov to suggest that the Russians are anywhere close to having psychotronic weapons."

Mike Beck, a former NSA spy, believes his Parkinson's disease was caused by electronic harassment. In 2014, the NSA gave Beck's attorney Mark Zaid a statement which said the agency had received "intelligence information from 2012 associating the hostile country to which Mr. Beck traveled in the late 1990s with a high-powered microwave system weapon", but added that "The National Security Agency has no evidence that such a weapon, if it existed and if it was associated with the hostile country in the late 1990s, was or was not used against Mr. Beck". NSA general counsel Glenn Gerstell told The Washington Post that "the agency has not found any proof that Beck or his co-worker were attacked".

== Support and advocacy communities ==
There are extensive online support networks and numerous websites maintained by people fearing mind control. Palm Springs psychiatrist Alan Drucker has identified evidence of delusional disorders on many of these websites, and psychologists agree that such sites negatively reinforce mental troubles, while some say that the sharing and acceptance of a common delusion could function as a form of group cognitive therapy.

According to psychologist Sheridan, the amount of content online about electronic harassment that suggests it is a fact without any debate on the subject creates a harmful ideological platform for such behavior.

As part of a 2006 British study by Vaughan Bell, independent psychiatrists determined "signs of psychosis are strongly present" based on evaluation of a sample of online mind-control accounts whose posters were "very likely to be schizophrenic." Psychologists have identified many examples of people reporting "mind control experiences" (MCEs) on self-published web pages that are "highly likely to be influenced by delusional beliefs." Common themes include "bad guys" using "psychotronics" and "microwaves," frequent mention of the CIA's MKULTRA project and frequent citing of a scientific paper entitled "Human auditory system response to modulated electromagnetic energy."

Some people who describe themselves as undergoing electronic harassment have organized and campaigned to stop the use of alleged psychotronic and other mind control weapons. These campaigns have received some support from public figures, including former U.S. Congressman Dennis Kucinich, who included a provision banning "psychotronic weapons" in a 2001 bill that was later dropped, and former Missouri State Representative Jim Guest.

== See also ==
- "Air Loom"
- On the Origin of the "Influencing Machine" in Schizophrenia
- Conspiracy Theory with Jesse Ventura
- Directed-energy weapon
- Electronic warfare
- Tin foil hat
- The Psychotronic Man
