= Depressive anxiety =

Freudian state of anxiety

Depressive anxiety is a term developed in relation to the depressive position by Melanie Klein, building on Freud's seminal article on object relations of 1917, 'Mourning and Melancholia'. Depressive anxiety revolved around a felt state of inner danger produced by the fear of having harmed good internal objects - as opposed to the persecutory fear of ego annihilation more typical of paranoid anxiety.

It may be distinguished from a depressive mood, which need not necessarily be tinged with anxiety.

== Stages ==
Depressive anxiety can be aroused at every developmental stage, from weaning through to the loss of familial dependence of adolescence or of one's youth in later life. Continual oscillation between paranoid and depressive anxieties can create a sense of psychic imprisonment; while conversely a lasting shift from the former to the latter can be seen as one of the marks of a successful analytic process.

== Defences ==
Defences against depressive anxiety include projective identification, whereby the anxieties are denied in oneself and placed in another person; a manic denial of the reality of an inner world at all; or a psychic retreat into a reduced and apathetic state of diminished feelings.

Didier Anzieu saw Freud's theoretical construction of psychoanalysis as a compulsive intellectualized defence against depressive anxiety.

== See also ==
- Paranoia
- Querulant
- Panic attack
- Delusional disorder
- Persecutory delusion
- Paranoid personality disorder
- Borderline personality disorder
