= Love and hate (psychoanalysis) =

Psychoanalytic concepts

Love and hate as co-existing forces have been thoroughly explored within the literature of psychoanalysis, building on awareness of their co-existence in Western culture reaching back to the “odi et amo” of Catullus, and Plato's Symposium.

== Love and hate in Freud’s work ==
Ambivalence was the term borrowed by Sigmund Freud to indicate the simultaneous presence of love and hate towards the same object. While the roots of ambivalence can be traced back to breast-feeding in the oral stage, it is re-inforced during toilet-training. Freudian followers such as Karl Abraham and Erik H. Erikson distinguished between an early sub-stage with no ambivalence at all towards the mother's breast, and a later oral-sadistic sub-phase where biting activity emerges, and the phenomenon of ambivalence appears for the first time. The child is interested in both libidinal and aggressive gratifications, and the mother's breast is at the same time loved and hated.

While during the pre-oedipal stages ambivalent feelings are expressed in a dyadic relationship between the mother and the child, during the oedipal conflict ambivalence is experienced for the first time within a triangular context which involves the child, the mother and the father. In this stage, both boys and girls develop negative feelings of jealousy, hostility and rivalry toward the parent of the same sex, but with different mechanisms for the two sexes. The boy's attachment to his mother becomes stronger, and he starts developing negative feelings of rivalry and hostility toward the father. The boy wishes to destroy the father so that he can become his mother's unique love object. On the other hand, the girl starts a love relationship with her father. The mother is seen by the girl as a competitor for the father's love and so the girl starts feeling hostility and jealousy towards her. The negative feelings which arise in this phase coexist with love and affection toward the parent of the same sex and result in an ambivalence which is expressed in feelings, behavior and fantasies. The negative feelings are a source of anxiety for the child who is afraid that the parent of the same sex would take revenge on him/her. In order to lessen the anxiety, the child activates the defense mechanism of identification, and identifies with the parent of the same sex. This process leads to the formation of the Super-Ego.

According to Freud, ambivalence is the precondition for melancholia, together with loss of a loved object, oral regression and discharge of the aggression toward the self. In this condition, the ambivalently loved object is introjected, and the libido is withdrawn into the self in order to establish identification with the loved object. The object loss then turns into an ego loss and the conflict between the Ego and the Super-Ego becomes manifested. The same ambivalence occurs in the obsessional neurosis, but there it remains related to the outside object.

== In the work of Melanie Klein ==
The object relations theory of Melanie Klein pivoted around the importance of love and hate, concern for and destruction of others, from infancy onwards. Klein stressed the importance of inborn aggression as a reflection of the death drive and talked about the battle of love and hatred throughout the life span. As life begins, the first object for the infant to relate with the external world is the mother. It is there that both good and bad aspects of the self are split and projected as love and hatred to the mother and the others around her later on: as analyst, she would find herself split similarly into a “nice” and a “bad” Mrs Klein.

During the paranoid-schizoid position, the infant sees objects around it either as good or bad, according to his/her experiences with them. They are felt to be loving and good when the infant's wishes are gratified and happy feelings prevail. On the other hand, objects are seen as bad when the infant's wishes are not met adequately and frustration prevails. In the child's world there is not yet a distinction between fantasy and reality; loving and hating experiences towards the good and bad objects are believed to have an actual impact on the surrounding objects. Therefore, the infant must keep these loving and hating emotions as distinct as possible, because of the paranoid anxiety that the destructive force of the bad object will destroy the loving object from which the infant gains refuge against the bad objects. The mother must be either good or bad and the feeling experienced is either love or hate.

Emotions become integrated as a part of the development process. As the infant's potential to tolerate ambivalent feelings with the depressive position, the infant starts forming a perception of the objects around it as both good and bad, thus tolerating the coexistence of these two opposite feelings for the same object where experience had previously been either idealised or dismissed as bad, the good object can be accepted as frustrating without losing its acceptable status. When this takes place, the previous paranoid anxiety (that the bad object will destroy everything) transforms into a depressive anxiety; this is the intense fear that the child's own destructiveness (hate) will damage the beloved others. Subsequently, for the coexistence of love and hate to be attainable, the child must believe in her ability to contain hate, without letting it destroy the loving objects. He/she must believe in the prevalence of the loving feelings over his/her aggressiveness. Since this ambivalent state is hard to preserve, under difficult circumstances it is lost, and the person returns to the previous manner keeping love and hate distinct for a period of time until he/she is able to regain the capacity for ambivalence.

See also The Life and Death Instincts in Kleinian Object Relations Theory.

== In the work of Ian Suttie ==
Ian Dishart Suttie (1898-1935) wrote the book The Origins of Love and Hate, which was first published in 1935, a few days after his death. He was born in Glasgow and was the third of four children. His father was a general practitioner, and Ian Suttie and both of his brothers and his sister became doctors as well. He qualified from Glasgow University in 1914. And soon went into psychiatry.

Although his work has been out of print, it is often cited and makes a contribution towards understanding the more difficult aspects of family relationships and friendships. He can be seen as one of the first significant object relations theorists and his ideas anticipated the concepts put forward by modern self psychologists.

Although Ian Suttie was working within the tradition set by Freud, there were a lot of concepts of Freud's theory he disagreed with. First of all, Suttie saw sociability, the craving for companionship, the need to love and be loved, to exchange and to participate, to be as primary as sexuality itself. And in contrast with Freud, he didn't see sociability and love simply as a derivative of sexuality. Secondly, Ian Suttie explained anxiety and neurotic maladjustment, as a reaction to the failure of finding a response for sociability; when primary social love and tenderness fails to find the response it seeks, the resulting frustration will produce a kind of separation anxiety. ‘Instead of an armament of instincts, latent or otherwise, the child is born with a simple attachment-to-mother who is the sole source of food and protection… the need for a mother is primarily presented to the child mind as a need for company and as a discomfort in isolation’.

Ian Suttie saw the infant as striving from the first to relate to the mother, and future mental health would depend on the success or failure of this first relationship (object relations). The advocates of this object relations paradigm all, except Melanie Klein, held that most differences in individual development that are of importance for mental health could be traced to differences in the way children were treated by their parents, or to the loss or separation of parent-figures. In the explanation of the love and hate relationship by Ian Suttie, the focus, lies in relations and the social environment. According to Suttie, Freud saw love and hate as two separate instincts. Hate had to be overcome with love, and because both terms are seen as two different instincts, this required repression. In Suttie's view, however, this is incompatible with the other Freudian view that life is a struggle to attain peace by the release of the impulse. These inconsistencies are caused by leaving out the social situations and motives. Suttie saw hate as the frustration aspect of love. “The greater the love, the greater the hate or jealousy caused by its frustration and the greater the ambivalence or guilt that may arise in relation to it.” Hate has to be overcome with love by the child removing the cause of the anxiety and hate by restoring harmonious relationships. The feeling of anxiety and hate can then change back into the feeling of love and security, between mother and child, and later for following relationships.

In Suttie's view, the beginning of the relationship between mother and child is a happy and symbiotic one as well. This happy symbiotic relationship between mother and baby can be disrupted by a second baby or the mother returning to work. This makes the infant feel irritable, insecure and anxious. This would be the start of the feeling of ambivalence: feelings of love and hate towards the mother. The child attempts to remove the cause of the anxiety and hate to restore the relationship (retransforming). This retransforming is necessary, because hate of a loved object (ambivalence) is intolerable.

== In the work of Edith Jacobson ==
The newborn baby is not able to distinguish the Self from Others and the relationship with the mother is symbiotic, with the two forming a unique object. In this period, the child generates two different images of the mother. On one hand there is the loving mother, whose image derives from experiences of love and satisfaction in the relationship with her. On the other hand, there is the bad mother, whose image derives from frustrating and upsetting experiences in the relationship. Since the child at this stage is unable to distinguish the self from the other, those two opposite images are often fused and confused, rather than distinguished. At about six months of age, the child becomes able to distinguish the self from the others. The child now understands that the mother can be both gratifying and frustrating, and starts experiencing the self as being able to feel both love and anger. This ambivalence results in a vacillation between attitudes of passive dependency on the omnipotent mother and aggressive strivings for self expansion and control over the love object. The passive-submissive and active-aggressive behaviour of the child during the pre-oedipal and the early oedipal period is determined by ambivalent emotional fluctuations between loving and trusting admirations of the parents, and disappointed depreciation of the loved objects. The ego can use these ambivalence conflicts to distinguish between the self and the object. At the beginning, the child tends to turn aggression toward the frustrating objects, and libido towards the self. Hence frustration, demands and restrictions imposed by parents within normal bounds, reinforce the process of discovery and distinction of the object and the self. When early experiences of severe disappointment and abandonment have prevented the building up of un-ambivalent object relations and stable identifications and weakened the child's self-esteem, they may result in ambivalence conflict in adulthood, which in turn causes depressive states.

== See also ==
- Borderline personality disorder
- Eros (concept)
- Attachment disorder
- Attachment theory
- Human bonding
- Philandry - love of men
- Philogyny - love of women
- Mother goddess
- Father figure
- Maternal deprivation
- Love–hate relationship
- Madonna–whore complex
- Sexual objectification
- Splitting (psychology)
- Misogyny - hatred of women
- Misandry - hatred of men
- Gynophobia - fear of women
- Misanthropy - hatred of humankind
- Self psychology
- Psychology of self
- Ian Suttie in History of attachment theory
- Obsessional neurosis in:
  - Purely Obsessional OCD
  - Rat Man section 'Notes Upon A Case Of Obsessional Neurosis'
  - Hysteria (play) Hysteria: Or Fragments of an Analysis of an Obsessional Neurosis
  - Freud's seduction theory
- Psychosexual development
  - Anal stage
  - Phallic stage
  - Genital stage
  - Oedipus complex
