= Emotional conflict =

Presence of different and opposing emotions relating to a situation

Emotional conflict is the presence of different and opposing emotions relating to a situation that has recently taken place or is in the process of being unfolded. They may be accompanied at times by a physical discomfort, especially when a functional disturbance has become associated with an emotional conflict in childhood, and in particular by tension headaches "expressing a state of inner tension...[or] caused by an unconscious conflict".

For C. G. Jung, "emotional conflicts and the intervention of the unconscious are the classical features of...medical psychology". Equally, "Freud's concept of emotional conflict as amplified by Anna Freud...Erikson and others is central in contemporary theories of mental disorder in children, particularly with respect to the development of psychoneurosis".

== In childhood development ==
"The early stages of emotional development are full of potential conflict and disruption". Infancy and childhood are a time when "everything is polarised into extremes of love and hate" and when "totally opposite, extreme feelings about them must be getting put together too. Which must be pretty confusing and painful. It's very difficult to discover you hate someone you love". Development involves integrating such primitive emotional conflicts, so that "in the process of integration, impulses to attack and destroy, and impulses to give and share are related, the one lessening the effect of the other", until the point is reached at which "the child may have made a satisfactory fusion of the idea of destroying the object with the fact of loving the same object".

Once such primitive relations to the mother or motherer have been at least partially resolved, "in the age period two to five or seven, each normal infant is experiencing the most intense conflicts" relating to wider relationships: "ideas of love are followed by ideas of hate, by jealousy and painful emotional conflict and by personal suffering; and where conflict is too great there follows loss of full capacity, inhibitions...symptom formation".

== Defences ==
Defenses against emotional conflict include "splitting and projection. They deal with intrapsychic conflict not by addressing it, but by sidestepping it". Displacement too can help resolve such conflicts: "If an individual no longer feels threatened by his father but by a horse, he can avoid hating his father; here the distortion way a way out of the conflict of ambivalence. The father, who had been hated and loved simultaneously, is loved only, and the hatred is displaced onto the bad horse".

== Physical symptoms ==
Inner emotional conflicts can result in physical discomfort or pain, often in the form of tension headaches, which can be episodic or chronic, and may last from a few minutes or hours, to days - associated pain being mild, moderate, or severe.

"The physiology of nervous headaches still presents many unsolved problems", as in general do all such "physical alterations...rooted in unconscious instinctual conflicts". However physical discomfort or pain without apparent cause may be the way our body is telling us of an underlying emotional turmoil and anxiety, triggered by some recent event. Thus for example a woman "may be busy in her office, apparently in good health and spirits. A moment later she develops a blinding headache and shows other signs of distress. Without consciously noticing it, she has heard the foghorn of a distant ship, and this has unconsciously reminded her of an unhappy parting".

== In the workplace ==
With respect to the post-industrial age, "LaBier writes of 'modern madness', the hidden link between work and emotional conflict...feelings of self-betrayal, stress and burnout". His "idea, which gains momentum in the post-yuppie late eighties...concludes that real professional success without regret of emotional conflict requires insanity of one kind or another".

== Cultural examples ==
- Advice on fiction writing emphasises the "necessity of creating powerful, emotional conflicts" in one's characters: "characters create the emotional conflict and the action emerges from the characters".
- Shakespeare's sonnets have been described as "implying an awareness of the possible range of human feelings, of the existence of complex and even contradictory attitudes to a single emotion"
- For Picasso "the presence of death is always coincident with the taste for life...the superb violence of these emotional transports have led some people to call his work expressionist".

== See also ==
- Ambivalence
- Conflict management
- Emotional intelligence
- Honne and tatemae
- Love-hate relationship
- Love and hate (psychoanalytic concepts)
- Neurosis
- Psychosomatic medicine
- Splitting (psychology)
