= Persecutory delusion =

Delusion involving perception of persecution

- Other names: Delusion of persecution, paranoid delusion
- Specialty: Psychiatry, clinical psychology
- Symptoms: False beliefs that one will be harmed, theory of mind deficits, violent behavior, safety behaviors, low self-esteem, rumination
- Complications: Premature death, heart disease, diabetes, high blood pressure, anxiety, depression, sleep disturbance
- Causes: Mental illness (schizophrenia, schizoaffective disorder, delusional disorder), emotional abuse, use of drugs or alcohol, family history
- Differential diagnosis: Delusions of guilt or sin and paranoid personality disorder
- Treatment: Antipsychotics, cognitive behavioral therapy, vitamin B12 supplements

Persecutory delusion, also known as delusion of persecution, is a type of delusional condition in which the affected person believes that harm is going to occur to oneself by a persecutor, despite a clear lack of evidence. The person may believe that they are being targeted by an individual or a group of people. Persecutory delusions are very diverse in terms of content and vary from the possible, although improbable, to the completely bizarre. The delusion can be found in various disorders, being more usual in psychotic disorders.

Persecutory delusion is at the more severe end of the paranoia spectrum and can lead to multiple complications, from anxiety to suicidal ideation. Persecutory delusions have a high probability of being acted upon; for example, not leaving the house due to fear, or acting violently. The persecutory delusion is a common type and is more prevalent in males.

Persecutory delusions can be caused by a combination of genetic (family history) and environmental (use of drugs or alcohol, emotional abuse) factors. This type of delusion is treatment-resistant. The most common methods of treatment are cognitive behavioral therapy, medications, namely first and second generation antipsychotics, and in severe cases, hospitalization. The diagnosis of the condition can be made using the DSM-5 or the ICD-11.

== Presentation ==
People with persecutory delusions may have bizarre beliefs, for instance, the patient may believe that the nurses are secretly altering their medication and environment in order to torment them, or that an unknown group of people are secretly messing with their thoughts as a form of manipulation, or that some assassins are out to get them and are hiding as civilians and waiting for the right moment.

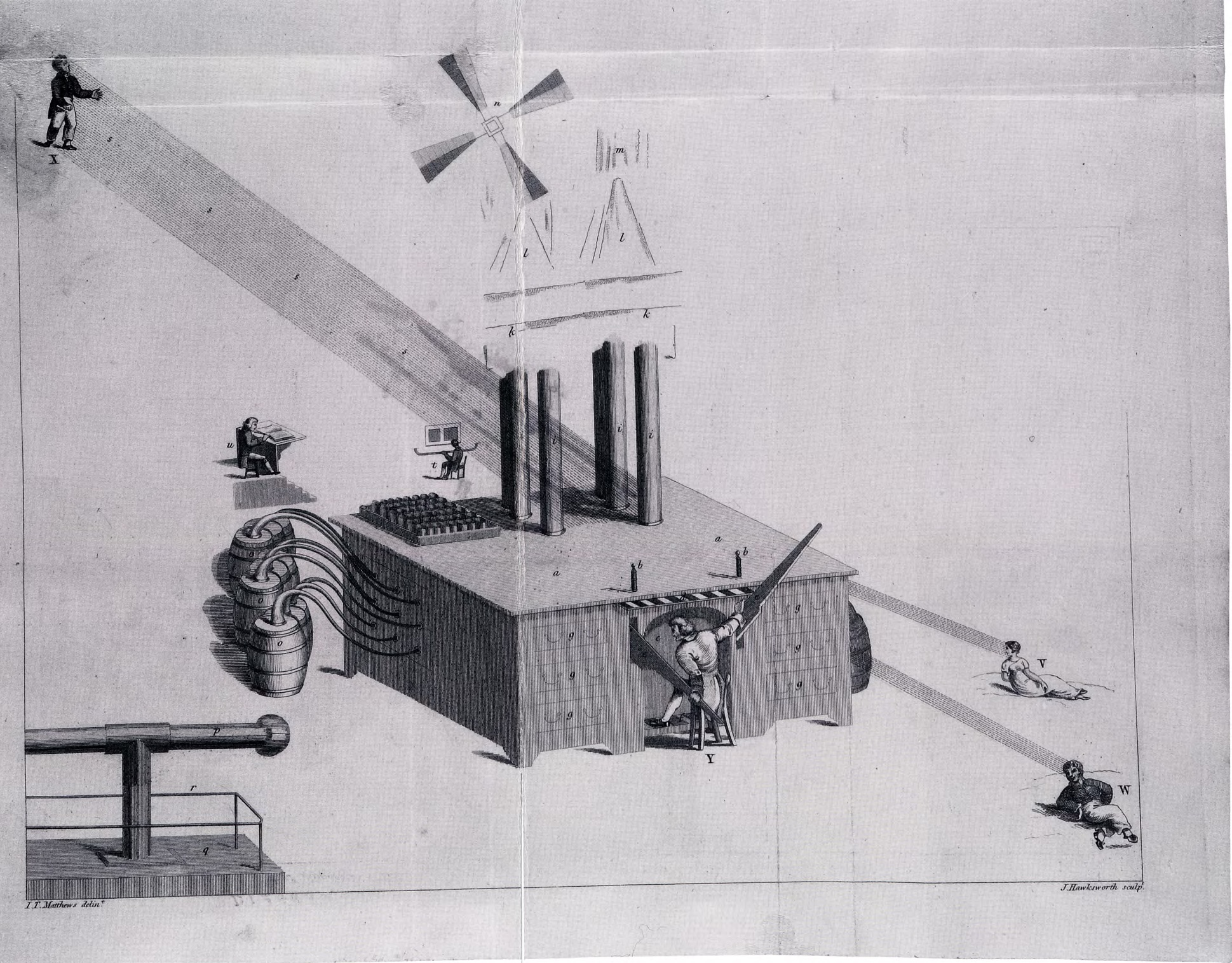
James Tilly Matthews's illustration of a gang of spies using an "air loom" to torment him at a distance

== Signs and symptoms ==
Persecutory delusions are persistent, distressing beliefs that one is being or will be harmed, that continue even when evidence of the contrary is presented. This condition is often seen in disorders like schizophrenia, schizoaffective disorder, delusional disorder, manic episodes of bipolar disorder, psychotic depression, and some personality disorders. Alongside delusional jealousy, persecutory delusion is the most common type of delusion in males and is a frequent symptom of psychosis. More than 70% of individuals with a first episode of psychosis reported persecutory delusions. Persecutory delusion is often paired with anxiety, depression, disturbed sleep, low self-esteem, rumination and suicidal ideation. High rates of worry, similar to those in generalized anxiety disorder, are present in individuals with the delusion, moreover the level of worry has been linked to the persistence of the delusion. People with persecutory delusion have an increased difficulty in attributing mental states to others and oftentimes misread others' intentions as a result.

People who present with this form of delusion are often in the bottom 2% in terms of psychological well-being. A correlation has been found between the imagined power the persecutor has and the control the sufferer has over the delusion. Those with a stronger correlation between the two factors have a higher rate of depression and anxiety. In urban environments, going outside leads people with this delusion to have major increases in levels of paranoia, anxiety, depression and lower self-esteem. People with this delusion often live a more inactive life and are at a higher risk of developing high blood pressure, diabetes and heart disease, having a lifespan 14.5 years less than the average as a result.

Those with persecutory delusion have the highest risk of acting upon those thoughts compared to other type of delusions, such acts include refusing to leave their house out of the fear of being harmed, or acting violently due to a perceived threat. Safety behaviors are also frequently found — individuals who feel threatened perform actions in order to avert their feared delusion from occurring. Avoidance is commonly observed: individuals may avoid entering areas where they believe they might be harmed. Some may also try to lessen the threat, such as only leaving the house with a trusted person, reducing their visibility by taking alternative routes, increasing their vigilance by looking up and down the street, or acting as if they would resist attack by being prepared to strike out.

== Causes ==
A study assessing schizophrenia patients with persecutory delusion found significantly higher levels of childhood emotional abuse within those people but found no differences of trauma, physical abuse, physical neglect and sexual abuse. Because individuals with the disorder tend to respond to the delusion with worry instead of challenging the content of the delusion, worry is responsible in developing and maintaining the persecutory thoughts on the individuals' minds. Biological elements, such as chemical imbalances in the brain and alcohol and drug use are a contributing factor to persecutory delusion. Genetic elements are also thought to influence, family members with schizophrenia and delusional disorder are at a higher risk of developing persecutory delusion.

Persecutory delusions are thought to be linked with problems in self-other control, that is, when an individual adjusts the representation of oneself and others in social interactions. (Note: For example, when empathizing with others, one's own mental and emotional state are temporarily put aside.) Because of this shortcoming, the person might misattribute their own negative thoughts and emotions onto others. Another theory is that the delusional belief arises due to low self-esteem. When a threat appears, the person protects themselves from negative feelings by blaming others.

The development of these delusional beliefs can be influenced by a past history of persecutory experiences — being stalked, drugged, or harassed. Certain factors further contribute to this, including having a low socioeconomic status, lacking access to education, experiencing discrimination, humiliation, and threats during early life, and being an immigrant.

== Treatment ==
Persecutory delusion is difficult to treat and is therapy resistant. Medications for schizophrenia are often used, especially when positive symptoms are present. Both first-generation antipsychotics and second-generation antipsychotics may be useful. Since these delusions are often accompanied with worry, using cognitive behavioral therapy to tackle this thought has shown to reduce the frequency of the delusions itself, improvement of well-being and less rumination. When vitamin B12 deficiency is present, supplements have shown positive results in treating those patients with persecutory delusion. Virtual reality cognitive therapy as a way to treat persecutory delusion, has shown a reduction in paranoid thinking and distress. Virtual reality permits patients to be immersed in a world that replicates real life but with a decreased amount of fear. Patients are then proposed to fully explore the environment without engaging in safety behaviors, thus challenging their perceived threat as unfounded.

== Diagnosis ==
The Diagnostic and Statistical Manual of Mental Disorders (DSM-5) enumerates eleven types of delusions. The International Classification of Diseases (ICD-11) defines fifteen types of delusions; both include persecutory delusion. They state that persecutory type is a common delusion that includes the belief that the person or someone close to the person is being maliciously treated. This encompasses thoughts that oneself has been drugged, spied upon, harmed, mocked, cheated, conspired against, persecuted, harassed and so on and may procure justice by making reports, taking action or responding violently.

In an effort to have a more detailed criteria for the disorder, a diagnostic table has been advanced by Daniel Freeman and Philippa Garety. It is divided in two criteria that must be met: the individual believes that harm is going to occur to oneself at the present or future, and that the harm is made by a persecutor. There are also points of clarification: the delusion has to cause distress to the individual; only harm to someone close to the person doesn't count as a persecutory delusion; the individual must believe that the persecutor will attempt to harm them and delusions of reference do not count within the category of persecutory beliefs.

== See also ==
- Daniel Paul Schreber
- Decompensation
- Gang stalking
- Grandiose delusions
- James Tilly Matthews
- On the Origin of the "Influencing Machine" in Schizophrenia
- Paranoia
- In object relations theory see: splitting (psychology), paranoid-schizoid and depressive positions, and paranoid anxiety
