= Panic attack =

Sudden periods of intense fear

- A depiction of someone experiencing a panic attack being reassured by another person
- Specialty: Psychiatry
- Symptoms: Sudden period of intense fear, palpitations, sweating, shaking, shortness of breath, numbness
- Complications: Self-harm, suicide, agoraphobia
- Usual onset: Over minutes
- Duration: Seconds to hours
- Causes: Panic disorder, social anxiety disorder, post-traumatic stress disorder, drug use, depression, medical problems
- Risk factors: Nicotine, caffeine, cannabis, psychological stress
- Diagnostic method: After other possible causes excluded
- Differential diagnosis: Hyperthyroidism, hyperparathyroidism, heart disease, lung disease, drug use, dysautonomia
- Treatment: Counseling, medications
- Medication: Acute: Benzodiazepines Preventative: Antidepressants, anxiolytics
- Prognosis: Usually good
- Frequency: 3% (EU), 11% (US)

Panic attacks are sudden periods of intense fear and discomfort that may include palpitations, otherwise defined as a rapid, irregular heartbeat, sweating, chest pain or discomfort, shortness of breath, trembling, dizziness, numbness, confusion, or a sense of impending doom or loss of control. Typically, these symptoms are the worst within ten minutes of onset and can last for roughly 30 minutes, though they can vary anywhere from seconds to hours. While they can be extremely distressing, panic attacks themselves are not physically dangerous.

The Diagnostic and Statistical Manual of Mental Disorders, Fifth Edition (DSM-5) defines them as "an abrupt surge of intense fear or intense discomfort that reaches a peak within minutes and during which time four or more of the following symptoms occur." These symptoms include, but are not limited to, the ones mentioned above.

Panic attacks function as a marker for assessing severity, course, and comorbidity (the simultaneous presence of two or more diagnoses) of different disorders, including anxiety disorders. Hence, while panic attacks cannot be applied to all disorders found in the DSM, they are a common comorbidity.

Panic attacks can be caused by an identifiable source, or they may happen without any warning and without a specific, recognizable situation.

Some known causes that increase the risk of having a panic attack include medical and psychiatric conditions (e.g., panic disorder, social anxiety disorder, post-traumatic stress disorder, substance use disorder, depression), substances (e.g., nicotine, caffeine), and psychological stress.

Before making a diagnosis, physicians seek to eliminate other conditions that can produce similar symptoms, such as hyperthyroidism (an overactive thyroid), hyperparathyroidism (an overactive parathyroid), heart disease, lung disease, and dysautonomia, disease of the system that regulates the body's involuntary processes.

Treatment of panic attacks should be directed at the underlying cause. In those with frequent attacks, counseling or medications may be used, as both preventative and abortive measures, ones that stop the attack while it is happening. Breathing training and muscle relaxation techniques may also be useful.

Panic attacks often appear frightening to both those experiencing and those witnessing them, and often, people sometimes think they are having heart attacks due to the symptoms. However, while they do not cause much immediate physical harm, they may be a predictive risk factor for cardiac and other illnesses.

Previous studies have suggested that those with anxiety disorders (e.g., panic disorder) are at higher risk of suicide.

In Europe, approximately 3% of the population has a panic attack in a given year, while in the United States, they affect about 11%. Panic attacks are more commonly diagnosed in females than males and often begin during late puberty or early adulthood. Panic attacks can continue on and off for a lifetime, or appear only infrequently. Young children are less commonly affected.

== Signs and symptoms ==
When people experience a panic attack, it usually comes on very suddenly and unexpectedly with a wide range of symptoms that tend to last, on average, a few minutes, but in infrequent cases can last for several hours. Typically, the symptoms of panic attacks reach their worst intensity in the first minute, then gradually subside over the next several minutes. During this time, people often feel intense fear that something catastrophic will happen despite there being no immediate danger. The frequency of panic attacks varies between individuals, with some people experiencing a panic attack as frequently as every week, while others could have one panic attack per year. The features that help define a panic attack are the collection of symptoms that accompany a panic attack. In panic disorder, panic attacks can occur unprompted; meaning there can be no obvious triggering event that causes the panic attack. Panic attacks can occur together with other anxiety disorders as well and can be associated with triggering events, such as someone with social anxiety disorder being in a difficult social situation, such as public speaking, with a co-occurring panic attack.

Panic attacks are associated with many different symptoms, with a person experiencing at least four of the following symptoms: increased heart rate, chest pain, palpitations (i.e. feeling like one's heart is pounding out of one's chest), difficulty breathing, choking sensation, nausea, abdominal pain, dizziness, lightheadedness (i.e. one feels like passing out), numbness or tingling (also called paresthesias), derealization (i.e. feeling detached from reality, like the events occurring are not real), depersonalization (i.e. feeling disconnected from one's body or thoughts), fear of losing control, and fear of dying.

These physical symptoms are typically concurrent with panic attacks in people who are prone to panicking. This results in increased anxiety and forms a positive feedback loop, meaning that the more a person with a panic attack has panic events, the more they experience feelings of "anticipatory anxiety" which serve to worsen their panic attacks. Panic attacks are distinguished from other forms of anxiety by their intensity and their sudden, episodic nature.

=== Chest pain ===
People can experience a wide range of symptoms during their panic attacks; they tend to be very intense and frightening and the common symptoms of difficulty breathing and chest pain can sometimes cause people to believe they are having a heart attack, leading them to go to the emergency department. Because chest pain and difficulty breathing are commonly symptoms of some sort of heart disease (such as a heart attack), there is medical importance in ruling out life-threatening reasons for their symptoms. A heart attack (also called a myocardial infarction) occurs when there is a blockage in the arteries going to the heart, causing less blood to get to the heart tissue, and ultimately causing the heart tissue to die. This would be evaluated in the emergency department with an electrocardiogram (i.e. a picture of the electrical activity of the heart) and by measuring a hormone called troponin, which is released from the heart tissue during times of stress on the tissue.

== Causes ==
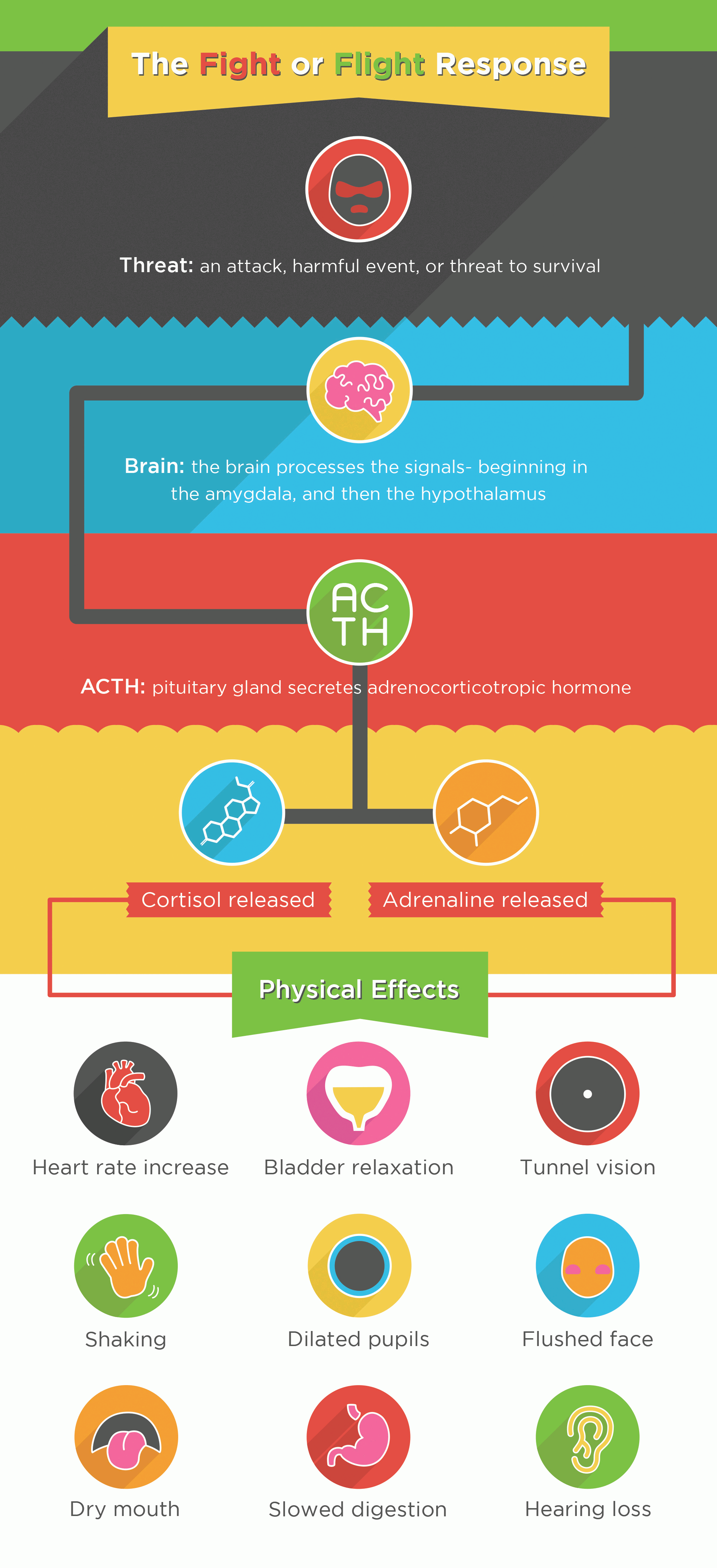

Panic attacks can be caused by a mix of factors. Biological factors that may lead to or be caused by panic attacks include psychiatric disorders such as post-traumatic stress disorder (PTSD) and obsessive–compulsive disorder (OCD), heart conditions, low blood pressure, and an overactive thyroid. Imbalance of the norepinephrine system, which is responsible for coordinating the body's fight-or-flight response, has been linked to panic attacks as well.

Panic disorder tends to arise in early adulthood, though it can occur at any age. It is more commonly diagnosed in women and in individuals with above-average intelligence. Research involving identical twins has shown that if one twin has an anxiety disorder, the other is likely to have one too.

Panic attacks may also occur due to short-term stressors. Major personal losses, like the end of a romantic relationship, life transitions such as jobs or moving, and other significant life changes may trigger a panic attack. Individuals who are naturally anxious, need a lot of reassurance, worry excessively about their health, have an overcautious view of the world, and have cumulative stress are more likely to experience panic attacks, which may actually cause some of those symptoms. For adolescents, social transitions, such as changes in classes and schools, may also be a contributing factor.

People often experience phobias as a direct result of panic attacks triggered by exposure to specific fears. A situation can become associated with panic after an attack has occurred in it, and most people with panic disorder come to avoid situations where they expect another attack, particularly places from which escape would be difficult or embarrassing, or where help might not be available.

Psychoactive substances may also induce panic attacks. For example, discontinuation or reduction in the dose of a drug (drug withdrawal) can cause panic attacks. Other psychoactive substances that are commonly known to be associated with panic attacks include cannabis and nicotine.

=== Panic disorder ===
A panic attack is an isolated episode of intense fear or discomfort that peaks within minutes. People who have repeated, persistent attacks or feel severe anxiety about having another attack are said to have panic disorder. Panic disorder is strikingly different from other types of anxiety disorders in that panic attacks are often sudden and unprovoked. However, panic attacks experienced by those with panic disorder may also be linked to or heightened by exposure to certain places or situations, making daily life difficult.

If a person has repeated and unexpected panic attacks, this could be a potential sign of panic disorder. According to the DSM-5, panic disorder can be diagnosed if a patient has not only recurrent panic attacks but also experiences at least a month of anxiety or worry about having additional attacks. This concern may lead to the person to modify their behavior to avoid situations that triggered the attack. Panic disorder can be diagnosed if the patient has another disorder at the same time (e.g., social anxiety disorder).

Patients affected by panic disorder can struggle with depression and a diminished quality of life. Compared to the general population, they are also at increased risk for substance abuse and addiction.

=== Agoraphobia ===
Panic disorder frequently presents with agoraphobia, which is an anxiety disorder where the individual presents with fear of a situation from which they cannot leave or escape, especially if a panic attack occurs. People who have had a panic attack in certain situations may develop phobias of these situations and begin to take measures to avoid them. Eventually, the pattern of avoidance and level of anxiety about another attack may reach the point where individuals with panic disorder are unable to drive or even step out of the house, preferring the safety of remaining in a known place. At this stage, the person is said to have panic disorder with agoraphobia.

In Japan, people who exhibit extreme agoraphobia to the point of becoming unwilling or unable to leave their homes are referred to as hikikomori. This term is used to describe both the person and the phenomenon. According to some Japanese psychiatrists, hikikomori can be caused by panic associated agoraphobia, or by withdrawal due to social anxiety. After first being defined by the Japanese Ministry of Health, Labor, and Welfare, a national research task force refined the definition as "the state of avoiding social engagement (e.g., education, employment, and friendships) with generally persistent withdrawal into one's residence for at least six months as a result of various factors".

== Pathophysiology ==
When panic attacks occur, people experience a sudden onset of fear and anxiety in a setting of no actual perceived threat (e.g., one's mind believes there is something threatening one's wellbeing, but there is nothing actual life-threatening occurring). This fear-based response leads to a release of the hormone adrenaline (epinephrine), which brings about the fight-or-flight response. The human nervous state consists of the sympathetic nervous system, which is responsible for the fight-or-flight (active) response, and the parasympathetic nervous system, which is responsible for the rest-and-digest (passive) response. The sympathetic nervous system prepares our body for strenuous physical activity by affecting different bodily functions such as increasing heart rate, increasing breathing, sweating among others, leading to the physical symptoms that accompany a panic attack. The exact mechanism behind panic attacks remains unclear; there are several different ideas for why some people experience panic attacks while others do not. The current theories include conscious or unconscious fears of entrapment, genetic susceptibility factors, the fear network model, theory of acid-base disturbances in the brain, and irregular activity of the amygdala (i.e., the part of the brain responsible for controlling emotions, such as fear, and identifying threats).

=== Fear network model ===
The fear network model hypothesizes that parts of our brain responsible for controlling the fear response that is created by the area of the brain where the amygdala is located (called the limbic system) is unable to control the fear sufficiently, leading to panic attacks. It is thought that dysfunction of the area responsible for controlling fear could be due to stress experienced in childhood, along with a genetic component as well. In summary, the fear network model states that the network in our brains responsible for responding to fear and then controlling that fear is not working properly, creating the inability for our brains to control fear that is occurring without any sort of external threat, leading to panic attacks.

=== Acid-base disturbances theory ===
This theory suggests that there is a part of the amygdala that is able to identify when the pH in our brain decreases, i.e. becomes more acidic. This part of the amygdala is called the acid-sensing ion channel. Since panic attacks typically occur without an obvious external trigger (meaning there is usually nothing life-threatening happening to cause a panic attack), studies have shown that panic attacks may be caused by internal triggers. One such internal trigger is the amygdala sensing acidosis, which can be caused by inhaling CO_{2} (carbon dioxide). In fact, one study has shown that people with a history of panic attacks had disturbances in their pH level minutes before having a panic attack.

Another theory, called the false suffocation alarm theory, is associated with the idea of acid-base imbalances in the amygdala. In this theory, inhalation of CO_{2} causes accumulation of acid in the blood and difficulty breathing, leading our brain to believe that we are suffocating, causing fear and panic. Studies have shown that inhaling CO_{2} can cause fear in people who do not have any prior history of panic attacks. This information has allowed scientists to suggest that panic attacks could be caused by our brain's inability to stop alarm signals that make us feel like we are suffocating.

=== Amygdala dysfunction theory ===
The amygdala in the human brain has several distinct sections that are responsible for our fear response. This theory suggests that problems in any of these brain areas or the connections between them could lead to excessive fear responses, like panic attacks. Studies have shown that in both animal and human subjects with a history of panic attacks, the amygdala is hyperactive with decreased volume when compared to the control. Another role the amygdala may play in panic attacks is decreasing its inhabitation (i.e., the amygdala not being shut down like it normally should), leading to increased levels of anxiety. A link between childhood traumatic experiences, as well as genetic abnormalities, has been found in those with a dysfunctional amygdala.

=== Neurotransmitter imbalances ===
Many neurotransmitters are affected when the body is under the increased stress and anxiety that accompany a panic attack. Some include serotonin, GABA (gamma-aminobutyric acid), dopamine, norepinephrine, and glutamate.

An increase of serotonin in certain pathways of the brain seems to be correlated with reduced anxiety. More evidence that suggests serotonin plays a role in anxiety is that people who take selective serotonin reuptake inhibitors (SSRIs) tend to feel a reduction of anxiety when their brain has more serotonin available to use.

The main inhibitory neurotransmitter in the central nervous system (CNS) is GABA. This neurotransmitter acts by inhibiting, or blocking nerve signals, which is very helpful in anxiety. In fact, medications that increase GABA activity in the brain, such as benzodiazepines and barbiturates, help with reducing anxiety almost immediately.

Dopamine's role in anxiety is not well understood. Some antipsychotic medications that block dopamine production have been proven to treat anxiety. However, this may be attributed to dopamine's tendency to increase feelings of self-efficacy and confidence, which indirectly reduces anxiety. On the other hand, other medications that increase dopamine levels have also been found to improve anxiety.

Many physical symptoms of anxiety, such as rapid heart rate and hand tremors, are regulated by norepinephrine. Drugs that counteract norepinephrine's effect may be effective in reducing the physical symptoms of a panic attack. On the other hand, some medications that raise overall norepinephrine levels, such as tricyclic antidepressants and serotonin–norepinephrine reuptake inhibitors (SNRIs), can be effective for treating panic attacks over the long term by reducing the sudden increases in norepinephrine that happen during a panic attack.

Because glutamate is the primary excitatory neurotransmitter involved in the central nervous system (CNS), it can be found in almost every neural pathway in the body. Glutamate is likely involved in conditioning, which is the process by which certain fears are formed, and extinction, which is the elimination of those fears.

=== Cardiac mechanism ===
People who have been diagnosed with panic disorder have approximately double the risk of heart disease. Panic attacks can cause chest pain by affecting blood flow in arteries of the heart. During a panic attack, the body's stress response is triggered which can cause the small vessels of the heart to tighten, leading to chest pain. The body's nervous system and rapid breathing during a panic attack can cause spasming of the arteries of the heart (also known as vasospasm). This can reduce blood flow to the heart, causing damage to heart tissue and chest pain, despite normal heart scans.

In individuals with a history of coronary artery disease, panic attacks and stress can make chest pain worse by increasing the heart's need for oxygen. This occurs because increased heart rate, blood pressure, and stress responses (i.e. the sympathetic nervous system) puts more strain on the heart.

== Diagnosis ==
According to the DSM-5, a panic attack is part of the diagnostic class of anxiety disorders. DSM-5 criteria for a panic attack is defined as "an abrupt surge of intense fear or intense discomfort that reaches a peak within minutes and during which time four or more of the following symptoms occur":

- Palpitations, or accelerated heart rate
- Sweating
- Trembling or shaking
- Sensations of shortness of breath or being smothered
- Feeling of choking
- Chest pain or discomfort
- Nausea or abdominal distress
- Feeling dizzy, unsteady, lightheaded, or faint
- Derealization (feelings of unreality) or depersonalization (being detached from oneself)
- Fear of losing control or going insane
- Sense of impending doom
- Paresthesias (numbness or tingling sensations)
- Chills or heat sensations

While some patients go to the emergency department due to their physical symptoms, there is no laboratory or imaging test used to diagnose panic attacks, it is a purely clinical diagnosis (i.e., the doctor uses their experience and expertise to diagnose panic attacks) once other more life-threatening diseases have been ruled out. In the research laboratory, there are diagnostic challenge tests for panic that rely on increasing the levels of certain naturally occurring chemicals. Most commonly, blood levels of sodium lactate are increased, or patients are given air with an increased level of carbon dioxide. These tests are considered to be sensitive in panic diagnosis, and very specific. Due to the physical symptoms that occur with a panic attack, people tend go to the emergency department for further evaluation; however, those who are experiencing panic attacks that are affecting their health and wellness should be seen by a mental health professional, such as a therapist or psychiatrist. Screening tools, such as the Panic Disorder Screener (PADIS), can be used to detect possible cases of panic disorder and suggest the need for a formal diagnostic assessment with a psychiatrist for further evaluation.

== Treatment ==
Panic disorder is usually effectively managed with a variety of interventions, including pharmacological treatment with medication, and psychological therapies. The focus on management of panic disorder involves reducing the frequency and intensity of panic attacks, reducing anticipatory anxiety and agoraphobia, and achieving full remission.

A panic attack usually starts abruptly, peaks within about 10 minutes and lasts 20 to 30 minutes, rarely more than an hour, after which the symptoms fade either quickly or gradually. However, benzodiazepines, specifically alprazolam and clonazepam, are frequently prescribed for panic disorder due to their quick onset of action and good tolerability. But because they take about 45 minutes to start working, they are not usually effective for ending a current, on-going attack. However, when clonazepam (which has a long half-life) is taken every 12 hours at a proper dose, it can prevent new panic attacks from starting. Additionally, deep breathing techniques and relaxation can be used and are occasionally found to be helpful while the person is experiencing a panic attack or immediately after as a way to calm oneself. Factors that maintain panic include avoidance of situations associated with attacks, anticipatory anxiety about having another one, and catastrophic misinterpretation of bodily symptoms as a sign of imminent harm such as a heart attack or suffocation.

Cognitive behavioral therapy (CBT) and clonazepam (every 12 hours) may have the most complete and longest duration of effect, followed by specific selective serotonin reuptake inhibitors (SSRIs) and CBT. Some research suggests that CBT is more effective at gaining coping skills than at effecting true panic cessation. A 2009 review found positive results from therapy and medication and a much better result when the two were combined. Even though there are modern medications to make short-term benefits to the patients life, long-term medication for panic disorder is not always utilized. There is however, a method that is proven to be most effective in long-term treatment which is to combine different treatment styles. These different styles include both clonazepam or antidepressants, and CBT therapy.

=== Lifestyle changes ===
Growing research suggests that along with standardized medical treatments, lifestyle changes can help alleviate some of the most common mental health conditions. Because of this, there has been a growing emphasis on the potential of lifestyle interventions and non-pharmacological methods for anxiety. These lifestyle interventions include, but are not limited to, focusing on physical activity, substance avoidance, and relaxation techniques. All are helpful, but their anti-panic benefits are not clear cut.

Exercise, especially aerobic, have become an alternative method for decreasing symptoms of anxiety and panic. Other more relaxing forms, such as yoga and tai chi, have also had similar effects in improving anxiety and can also be used as adjunctive therapy. Numerous studies have determined that exercise is inversely related to anxiety symptoms, thus as physical activity increases, levels of anxiety seem to decrease. On the other hand, some people with panic disorder may be more averse to exercise. There is evidence that suggests that this effect is correlated to the release of exercise-induced endorphins and the subsequent reduction of the stress hormone, cortisol. One thing to keep in mind is that with exercise, often comes increased respiration rate. This can lead to hyperventilation and hyperventilation syndrome, which mimics symptoms of a heart attack, thus inducing a panic attack, so it is important to pace the exercise regimen accordingly.

Substance avoidance can be important in reducing anxiety and panic symptoms, as many substances can cause, exacerbate, or mimic symptoms of panic disorder. For example, caffeine has been known to have anxiety and panic-inducing properties that can especially present in those who are more susceptible to panic attacks. Anxiety and panic can also temporarily increase during withdrawal from caffeine and various other drugs and substances.

Meditation may also be helpful in the treatment of panic disorder. Muscle relaxation techniques are useful to some individuals as well. These can be learned using recordings, videos, or books. While muscle relaxation has proved to be less effective than cognitive behavioral therapy in controlled trials, many people still find at least temporary relief from muscle relaxation.

=== Breathing exercises ===
Irregularities in breathing, including hyperventilation and shortness of breath, are key features of anxiety and panic attacks. Hyperventilation syndrome occurs when an individual experiences deep, quick-paced breathing, eventually affecting blood flow to the brain and altering conscious awareness.

It has been shown that several various breathwork techniques can reduce symptoms in patients diagnosed with anxiety disorders. By managing and focusing on breathing, individuals with anxiety experience less tension and stress in their muscles, as well as a diminished stress response. Breathing retraining exercise helps to rebalance the oxygen and CO_{2} levels in the blood, improving cerebral blood flow. Capnometry, which provides exhaled CO_{2} levels, may help guide breathing.

David D. Burns recommends breathing exercises for those with anxiety. One such breathing exercise is a 5-2-5 count. Using the stomach (or diaphragm)—and not the chest—inhale (feel the stomach come out, as opposed to the chest expanding) for 5 seconds. As the maximal point at inhalation is reached, hold the breath for 2 seconds. Then slowly exhale, over 5 seconds. Repeat this cycle twice and then breathe 'normally' for 5 cycles (1 cycle = 1 inhale + 1 exhale). The point is to focus on breathing and relax the heart rate.

Although breathing into a paper bag was a common recommendation for short-term treatment of symptoms of an acute panic attack, it has been criticized as inferior to measured breathing.

=== Therapy ===
According to the American Psychological Association, "most specialists agree that a combination of cognitive and behavioral therapies are the best treatment for panic disorder." Medication is appropriate in many cases. The first part of therapy is largely informational; many people are greatly helped by simply understanding exactly what panic disorder is and how many others experience it. Many people with panic disorder are worried that their panic attacks mean they are "going crazy" or that the panic might induce a heart attack. Cognitive restructuring helps people to replace those thoughts with more realistic, positive ways of viewing the attacks. Avoidant behavior, such as what is seen in patients with agoraphobia, is one of the key aspects that prevent people with frequent panic attacks from functioning healthily. Exposure therapy, which includes repeated and prolonged confrontation with feared situations and body sensations, helps weaken anxiety responses to panic-inducing external and internal stimuli.

In deeper-level psychoanalytic approaches, in particular object relations theory, panic attacks are frequently associated with splitting (psychology), paranoid-schizoid and depressive positions, and paranoid anxiety. They are often found to be comorbid with borderline personality disorder and child sexual abuse.

There was a meta-analysis of the comorbidity of panic disorders and agoraphobia that used exposure therapy to treat hundreds of patients over a period of time. A result was that thirty-two percent of patients had a panic episode after treatment. They concluded that the use of exposure therapy has some efficacy for a client who is living with a panic disorder and agoraphobia.

=== Medication ===
Medication options for panic attacks typically include benzodiazepines (clonazepam and alprazolam) and antidepressants. Benzodiazepines are being prescribed less often because excess concern about such potential side effects such as dependence, fatigue, slurred speech, and memory loss. Antidepressant treatments for panic attacks include selective serotonin reuptake inhibitors (SSRIs), serotonin–norepinephrine reuptake inhibitors (SNRIs), tricyclic antidepressants (TCAs), and monoamine oxidase inhibitors (MAOIs).

SSRIs in particular tend to be the first drug treatment used to treat panic attacks. SSRIs and tricyclic antidepressants appear similar for short-term efficacy.

SSRIs carry a relatively low risk since they are not associated with much tolerance or dependence, and have a more tolerable side effect profile. TCAs are similar to SSRIs in their many advantages, and may be more effective, but they do come with more common side effects such as weight gain and cognitive disturbances. MAOIs are generally suggested for patients who have not responded to other forms of treatment.

While the use of drugs in treating panic attacks can be very successful, it is generally recommended that people also be in some form of therapy, such as cognitive behavioral therapy. Drug treatments are usually used throughout the duration of panic attack symptoms and discontinued after the patient has been free of symptoms for at least six months. It is usually safest to discontinue these drugs gradually while undergoing therapy. While drug treatment seems promising for children and adolescents, they are at an increased risk of suicidal thoughts while taking these medications and their well-being should be monitored closely.

== Prognosis ==
Panic attacks, while unpleasant, are not life-threatening. However, recurrent panic attacks can significantly affect one's mental health if people experiencing them do not seek or benefit from treatment. Sometimes, panic attacks can develop into phobias or panic disorder if untreated. However, when treated, people can do very well, with symptoms decreasing or fully disappearing within several weeks to months.

== Epidemiology ==
In Europe, about 3% of the population has a panic attack in a given year. In the United States, they affect about 11%. Panic attacks are more common in females than in males. They often begin during puberty or early adulthood. Children and older people are less commonly affected. Results from twin and family studies have concluded that disorders, such as panic disorder, have a genetic component and are inherited or passed down through genes.

== See also ==
- Generalized anxiety disorder
- Hysteria
- Nervous breakdown
- Panic
