= Paranoid anxiety =

Term in object relations theory of psychoanalysis

Paranoid anxiety is a term used in object relations theory, particularly in discussions about the paranoid-schizoid and depressive positions. The term was frequently used by Melanie Klein, especially to refer to a pre-depressive and persecutory sense of anxiety characterised by the psychological splitting of objects.

== Further developments ==
Donald Meltzer saw paranoid anxiety as linked not only to a loss of trust in the goodness of objects, but also to a confusion between feeling and thought.

For the extreme forms of such anxiety, he coined the term 'terror', to convey something of the qualitatively different intensity of their nature.

== External sources ==
Freud considered that there was generally a small kernel of truth hidden in the exaggerated anxiety of the paranoid - what Hanns Sachs described as an amoeba about to become monster.

The anti-psychiatrist David Cooper argued indeed that "The therapist in working with people might far more often have to confirm the reality of paranoid fears than in any sense disconfirm or attempt to modify them", but most family therapists would probably agree that this is an extreme and one-sided position.

== Defensive functions ==
Idealisation (as in the transference) can be used as a defence against deeper paranoid anxieties about the actual presence of a destructive, denigrating object.

Conversely, paranoid fears, especially when systematised, may themselves serve as a defence against a deeper, chaotic disintegration of the personality.

== Persecutory anxiety state (panic attack) and persecutory delusion ==
Paranoid anxiety may reach the level of a persecutory anxiety state (a form of panic attack), including various levels of persecutory delusions (the preferred term to paranoid delusions).

Heavy drinking is said to sometimes precipitate acute paranoid panic – the protagonist's unconscious hostile impulses being projected onto all those around.

== Literary examples ==
Hamm in Endgame by Samuel Beckett has been singled out as a character driven by paranoid anxiety.

== See also ==
- Depressive anxiety a parallel concept of general anxiety yet arising from the depressive position.
- Persecutory delusion
- Panic attack
- Paranoia
- Paranoid personality disorder
- Delusion
- Psychotic paranoid symptoms in Borderline personality disorder
- Paranoid ideation in Symptom Checklist 90
- Persecutory type in Delusional disorder
- Psychoanalytic concepts of love and hate
- Querulant
- Types of stalkers, particular Intimacy seekers in Stalking
- ICD-10 Thought insertion
