= Love–hate relationship =

Figure of speech

A love–hate relationship is an interpersonal relationship involving simultaneous or alternating emotions of love and hate—something particularly common when emotions are intense. The term is used frequently in psychology, popular writing and journalism. It can be applied to relationships with inanimate objects, or even concepts, as well as those of a romantic nature or between siblings or parents/children.

== Psychological roots ==
A love–hate relationship has been linked to the occurrence of emotional ambivalence in early childhood, to conflicting responses by different ego states within the same person, or to the inevitable co-existence of egoistic conflicts with the object of love.

Individuals with narcissistic personality disorder or borderline personality disorder have been seen as particularly prone to aggressive reactions towards love objects, not least when issues of self-identity are involved: in extreme instances, hate at the very existence of the other may be the only emotion felt, until love breaks through behind it.

Research from Yale University suggests love–hate relationships may be the result of poor self-esteem.

== Family and development ==
Love–hate relationships also develop within a familial context, especially between an adult and one or both of their parents. Love–hate relationships and sometimes complete estrangement between adults and one or both of their parents often indicates poor bonding with either parent in infancy, depressive symptoms of parents, borderline or narcissistic pathology in the adult child, and/or parental alienation in childhood. Parents who alienate their children from the other parent frequently suffer from borderline personality disorder (BPD) or narcissistic personality disorder (NPD). Children who experience parental alienation techniques by a borderline parent report a higher prevalence of low self-esteem, low self-sufficiency, insecure attachment styles, and higher levels of depression in adulthood. One of the development tasks for humans is to balance the primary love and hate drives as to tolerate ambivalence toward a loved object. When this task is unsuccessfully accomplished, severe psychopathology can ensue. Individuals with BPD and NPD often fail to accomplish the task of ambivalence. They are unable to be simultaneously angry at someone they love, without destroying the love (Corradi, 2013). Children are unable to tolerate the ambivalence, and are indoctrinated to choose. Despite feeling love for their alienated parent, they let go entirely of the loved object. This creates an occasion for the development of ego defenses in the child referred to as “splitting.”

As a way of understanding splitting, a common feature of BPD and NPD, is described as “a pattern of unstable and intense interpersonal relationships characterized by alternating between extremes of idealization and devaluation” (American Psychiatric Association, 2013, p. 663).

A love–hate relationship may develop when people have completely lost the intimacy within a loving relationship, yet still retain some passion for, or perhaps some commitment to, each other, before degenerating into a hate–love relationship leading to divorce.

== Culture ==
- The Japanese word “tsundere” is derived from two Japanese terms: “tsun tsun” (ツンツン) (adverb, 'morosely, aloofly, offputtingly') and “dere dere” (でれでれ) (adverb, 'in a lovey-dovey or infatuated manner'). A tsundere character is one who frequently switches between insulting their love interest and acting lovestruck or kind toward them. Tsundere characters usually belittle their love interest at first but eventually become kinder to them over time.
  - A more abstract term for love–hate exists, “aizō” (愛憎).
- Catullus introduced the love–hate theme into Western culture with his famous lines: "I hate and yet love. You may wonder how I manage it. I don't know, but feel it happen, and am in torment".
- The concept of a love–hate relationship is frequently used in teen romance novels where two characters are shown to "hate" each other, but show some sort of affection or attraction towards each other at certain points of the story.
- The screwball comedy film genre features couples feeling intense attraction and intense conflict.

== See also ==
- Actaeon
- Ambivalence
- Borderline personality disorder
- False dilemma
- Femme fatale
- Frenemy
- Jealousy
- Love triangle
- Madonna–whore complex
- On-and-off relationship
- Petrarch
- Private Lives
- Psychoanalytic concepts of love and hate
- Shipping (fandom)
- Sibling rivalry
- Splitting (psychology)
- Tough love
