= Ambivalence =

Simultaneous conflicting beliefs or feelings

Ambivalence is a state of having simultaneous conflicting reactions, beliefs, or feelings towards some object. Stated another way, ambivalence is the experience of having an attitude towards someone or something that contains both positively and negatively valenced components. The term also refers to situations where "mixed feelings" of a more general sort are experienced, or where a person experiences uncertainty or indecisiveness.

Although attitudes tend to guide attitude-relevant behavior, those held with ambivalence tend to do so to a lesser extent. The less certain an individual is in their attitude, the more impressionable it becomes, hence making future actions less predictable and/or less decisive. Ambivalent attitudes are also more susceptible to transient information (e.g., mood), which can result in a more malleable evaluation. However, since ambivalent people think more about attitude-relevant information, they also tend to be more persuaded by (compelling) attitude-relevant information than less-ambivalent people.

Explicit ambivalence may or may not be experienced as psychologically unpleasant when the positive and negative aspects of a subject are both present in a person's mind at the same time. Psychologically uncomfortable ambivalence, also known as cognitive dissonance, can lead to avoidance, procrastination, or to deliberate attempts to resolve the ambivalence. People experience the greatest discomfort from their ambivalence at the time when the situation requires a decision to be made. People are aware of their ambivalence to varying degrees, so the effects of an ambivalent state vary across individuals and situations. For this reason, researchers have considered two forms of ambivalence, only one of which is subjectively experienced as a state of conflict.

== Types of attitudinal ambivalence ==
=== Felt ambivalence ===
The psychological literature has distinguished between several different forms of ambivalence. One, often called subjective ambivalence or felt ambivalence, represents the psychological experience of conflict (affective manifestation), mixed feelings, mixed reactions (cognitive manifestation), and indecision (behavioral manifestation) in the evaluation of some object. Ambivalence is not always acknowledged by the individual experiencing it. Although, when the individual becomes aware to a varying degree, discomfort is felt, which is elicited by the conflicting attitudes about a particular stimulus.

Subjective ambivalence is generally assessed using direct self-report measures regarding one's experience of conflict about the topic of interest. Because subjective ambivalence is a secondary judgment of a primary evaluation (i.e., I'm conflicted of my positive attitude towards the president), it is considered to be metacognitive. The point of these measures is to find out how much a person experiences ambivalence in a particular evaluation. Their report may be provided in a number of ways.

Priester and Petty, for example, utilized a rating system where they had subjects rate the level of conflict they were experiencing on a scale from 0 (as in the subject experienced "no conflict at all") to 10 (as in the subject experienced "maximum conflict"). However, people do not like to experience the negative emotions associated with ambivalence and therefore may not acknowledge, or report, their level of conflict as accurately as possible. This makes the measure of felt ambivalence a bit less reliable than a researcher may desire.

=== Potential ambivalence ===
Another measure of ambivalence that has been developed is called objective ambivalence or potential ambivalence, which represents the simultaneous acknowledgement of both positive and negative evaluations regarding a particular stimulus. Objective ambivalence is an indirect measure of attitude conflict that allows individuals to answer questions based on more accessible aspects of their attitude and is therefore generally viewed as an advantageous means of measurement. This indirect measure does not assume that the individual has complete knowledge and/or awareness of their attitudinal conflict and helps to eliminate confounding factors that may be affecting their attitudes.

Objective ambivalence is generally assessed using a method first developed by Kaplan, in which a standard bipolar attitude scale (e.g., extremely negative to extremely positive) is split into two separate scales, each independently assessing the magnitude of one valence (e.g., not at all negative to extremely negative). If a person endorses both positive and negative reactions towards the same object, then at least some objective ambivalence is present.

Kaplan initially defined ambivalence as total affect (the sum of positive and negative reactions) minus polarity (the absolute difference of positive and negative reactions). For example, if objective ambivalence towards exercising was assessed using two separate 6-point scales, and a person indicated that his or her evaluation was slightly negative (e.g., 2 on a 6-point scale) and extremely positive (e.g., 6 on a 6-point scale), this person's ambivalence would be quantified by 2 times the lesser of these two evaluations (i.e., 4 in this example).

Kaplan's measure yields the formula: $Ambivalence = L+S - (L-S)=2S$

Here, S represents the smaller rating or reaction (called "conflicting" reaction in the seminal paper by Priester and Petty), and L represents the larger rating or dominant reaction.

However, Kaplan's measure has largely been replaced in practice by one proposed by Thompson et al. Thompson' s formula fulfills the three necessary conditions for any scale measuring ambivalence as suggested by Breckler.

The three conditions are as follows:

1. If the larger value is maintained, while the smaller rating increases, ambivalence will increase.
2. If the smaller value is maintained, while the larger rating increases, ambivalence will decrease.
3. If both the larger and smaller values are the same, ambivalence will increase when both ratings increase (as the difference between the two will increase) or decrease as the values decrease.

Thompson et al. refined Kaplan's formula to incorporate Breckler's components: $Ambivalence= (L+S)/2-(L-S)=1.5S -.5L$

=== Predictors of felt ambivalence ===
Research has shown only a moderate correlation between felt and potential ambivalence, although, both measures are useful depending on what is being asked. Potential ambivalence is often utilized by ambivalence researchers to gather more information about diversity of attitudes across contexts. Each individual experiences the after-effects of unpleasant feelings in a different way, whether or not associated with ambivalence awareness.

There are two primary moderators that link felt and potential ambivalence: simultaneous accessibility and preference for consistency.

Simultaneous accessibility is when potential ambivalence depends on how quickly and uniformly conflicting evaluations come to mind. Positive and negative knowledge regarding beliefs about an attitude object are concurrently known, but not always accessible. Only when the connection of the evaluations are applicable and coinciding to awareness, does potential ambivalence result in felt ambivalence.

Preference for consistency uses incentives to combine incoming stimuli with current variables in order to respond to approaching impulses. In other words, people often review past behaviors when making new decisions; if preference for consistency is high, they are more likely to ignore new information and are thus bias to past behaviors.

== Dimensions of attitudinal assessment as applied to ambivalence ==
=== One-dimensional perspective ===
Traditionally, attitudes were considered one-dimensional—from positive to negative—but given the rise of research findings, this perspective has lost much of its value. Ambivalence studies were a primary reason that attitudinal assessments demanded a new design. Because the basic assumption of an ambivalent attitude is that it is paradoxical, a one-dimensional perspective is likely to portray faulty information. For instance, a numerical rating of zero can be produced both by someone with a love-hate relationship toward an object, and someone who is completely indifferent about that object. There is a significant difference in the behaviors and experiences of those possessing strong conflicting attitudes, compared to those who are simply neutral. This perspective is unsuitable for examining ambivalence and based on current research does not appear to accurately reflect how attitudes function and are experienced.

=== Two-dimensional perspective ===
The two-dimensional perspective separately rates positive and negative attitudes toward an attitudinal object. The relative magnitude of positive and negative rankings are recognized by this model, providing a distinction between ambivalence and indifference. By comparing the magnitude of attitudes, the two-dimensional perspective also allows for an approximation of the degree of ambivalence; similarity in the magnitude of an individual's positive and negative attitude towards an object indicating ambivalence, and the strength of these attitudes reveals its degree. The two-dimensional view can report everything the one-dimensional perspective can, but it has the added ability to account for ambivalence. Though this model of attitude is clearly more useful for understanding and potentially assessing ambivalence than a one dimensional model it still suffers numerous paradoxes which are difficult to argue away without acknowledging that there is more contributing to one's attitudes and their stability than perceptions regarding the object alone. These issues prompt the recent emergence of multidimensional models.

=== Multidimensional perspective ===
The Multidimensional model for attitude deviates from the linear perspectives previously mentioned. Conceptually the multidimensional model can be thought of as a network of attitudinal hubs which form a web of contributions contributing to one's attitude about a particular object. Thus ones attitude toward an object is a product of the attitudes one holds for all related objects which are activated consciously or unconsciously when considering the object in question, and is not simply an attribution regarding the object alone in a vacuum. Ambivalence occurs when there are near equal weight of contributions of both positive and negative sources according to this perspective. Note in this view the ambivalent attitude is not tied directly to the object but rather the near equivalence of positive and negative contributing attitudes.

This model is very useful for understanding why attitude towards an object can fluctuate often within a relatively short span. If this model is accurate than a change in the degree of activation of particular objects related to the attitudinal object in question will alter the degree to which they contribute their attitudinal influence towards one's current attitude regarding the object in question. This allows for variance in attitude towards an object without requiring any permanent change in one's beliefs regarding neither the object nor the objects related to it. According to this model one's attitude towards eating a high calorie dessert food would likely become more positive during times when an individual is hungry, as the centers associated with the satiation property of food are now more active and contributing more influence to the attitude regarding consuming the dessert. The other contributing attitudes do not need to have been suppressed (though they can be) for the temporary change in attitude all that is required, is an increase in the output of one contributor.

Continued or repeated activation of the same related objects to a given attitudinal object will likely be reinforced and over time lend more stability to the attitude, and are likely to diminish the activation of those objects not strongly activated; however, the contributing objects are themselves also subject to changes in attitudes regarding them, so no final resolution of stability will necessarily occur. In addition if the same conflicting attitudinal contributors are continuing to "fire together" they will both be reinforced and thus may not contribute towards the resolution of ambivalence.

=== Meta-cognitive model ===
Not all attitude objects are linked to both positive and negative relations. This model is built on the idea that meta-cognition has to do with "knowing about knowing." The process works if someone has the knowledge about cognition and is also able to control their thoughts. An evaluation creates initial thoughts that are then analyzed by a secondary thought which may vary in strength toward an assessment. Once an evaluation is obtained, the strength of the validity affects how the interpretation is perceived. If a successful univalent attitude is achieved, final evaluations are labelled as either true or false based on varying degrees of confidence.

== Consistency theories and ambivalence ==
=== Overview ===
Cognitive consistency theories were established on the premise that individuals prefer dependable and coherent cognition. Inconsistency in one's thoughts, feelings, emotions, values, beliefs, attitudes, or behaviors causes tension. In the past, consistency theorists focused primarily on the instinctive drive to reduce this psychological discomfort and return to a simple, balanced state. Unlike classical approaches, however, theories of attitudinal ambivalence are more concerned with the perceived paradoxical state itself.

=== Balance theory ===
Fritz Heider established the first approach in the growing family of consistency theories; balance theory seeks to understand one's thoughts regarding their personal relationship with others and with the environment. Triadic relationships are used to evaluate the structure and quality of attitudes within a given arrangement.

Social ties, for example, can be analyzed in terms of an individual's perception of the relationships between his or her self (p), another person (o), and the topic (e.g., issue, belief, value, object) of focus (x). According to Heider, a balanced triangle is accomplished when all three links are positive, or two are negative and one is positive (since a positive number is still achieved).

The overall assumption of balance theory is rooted in the philosophy that unbalanced states have a tendency to wreak havoc. Satisfying relationships require balance, otherwise, it is not uncommon to experience consequences like stress, tension, or ambivalence.

=== Evaluative-cognitive consistency theory ===
Evaluative-cognitive consistency theory refers to a condition in which one holds opposing attitudes towards an object that are not of equal magnitude; the focus is the overall difference in evaluations, with no regard to magnitude.

"Ambivalence is a function of the amount of conflict within an attitude, whereas evaluative-cognitive consistency is a function of the magnitude of the difference between evaluations."

In a set of dimension scores, for example, positive 5 and negative 5 have the same degree of consistency as does the set of positive 9 and negative 1. Yet, the degree of ambivalence in each set is vastly different. This distinction is important when examining the implications and effects of ambivalence, since seemingly similar ratings are in fact quite different.

The two-dimensional perspective of attitudinal assessment can distinguish between ambivalence and evaluative-cognitive consistency. As ratings increase, both ambivalence and evaluative-cognitive consistency have a tendency to be less stable and less effective at predicting behavior.

Past studies have linked ambivalent mental states to slower response times (due to low accessibility) and mild attitudes, although theories of evaluative-cognitive consistency have yet to report such findings.

=== Cognitive dissonance theory ===
The feeling of discomfort that results from inconsistent cognition is a powerful determinant of human behavior. The emergence of research on intellectual tension dates back to the mid-20th century, and has been a hot topic in social psychology ever since. In 1957, Leon Festinger was the first to investigate the phenomenon, thereupon coining the theory of cognitive dissonance. Festinger and other early psychologists held the notion that cognitive dissonance was the result of any two conflicting thoughts or opinions. Currently, however, research has proven that not all cognitive inconsistencies are equally upsetting, for it is not necessarily the dissonance itself that causes strife, rather, it is the individuals construct of the given contention.

Dissonance, then, is characterized as a discrepancy between an attitude held by an individual and the actual behavior that is practiced by that individual, whereas ambivalence is seen as having a disparity within the attitude itself. Though unique, the ambivalent state, still, is closely connected to dissonance theory, being its most common product.

Individuals seek to satisfy a stable and positive self-image. For this reason, the greatest tension is encountered when there is an incongruity between who one thinks they are and their actual behavior. Such threats to self-esteem evoke motivation to rid oneself of the distress. According to present research, there are three widely accepted methods to reduce cognitive dissonance:

1. Justify the behavior by changing the dissonant cognition
2. Justify the behavior by adding new cognitions
3. Change the behavior to meet the dissonant cognition

== Motivation and information processing ==
As noted above, the desire to maintain one's preconceived notions can have vast implications. Studies have shown it is not uncommon for people to distort reality while attempting reduce ambivalence. The manner by which one chooses to replace unwanted thoughts is mostly an unconscious process, yet several factors influence the ability and likelihood of doing so.

=== Heuristic-systematic model ===
Information processing for ambivalent attitudes is less efficient and takes longer than processing of attitudes that are relatively univalent. The information is less accessible, so it takes longer for a person to integrate multiple viewpoints regarding an attitude object into one cohesive opinion or judgement. The lack of accessibility here does serve to reduce a biased thought process. Yet, since it takes a greater amount of effort to resolve two conflicting attitudes, if one desires to form a conclusion, a more extensive thought process is necessary.

== Antecedents of ambivalence ==
=== Behavioral indicators ===
Researchers have sought to understand the relationship between objective and subjective ambivalence. Thompson and his colleagues argue that people with positive and negative evaluations which are of similar magnitude (e.g., +4 and -3) should experience more ambivalence than people whose evaluations are of dissimilar magnitude (e.g., +4 and -1). Similarly, they argue that even with relatively similar positive and negative evaluations, people whose evaluations are more extreme (e.g., +6 and -5) should experience more ambivalence than people whose evaluations are less extreme (e.g., +2 and -1).

The Griffin formula, also known as the similarity-intensity model: $Ambivalence = (P + N) / 2 - |P-N|$

Here, P and N are the magnitude of positive and negative reactions, respectively.

Some research has stated that as the relative contribution of dominant reactions decreases, the magnitude of conflicting reactions increases. Other studies have found that objective ambivalence predicts subjective ambivalence to a greater extent when both the positive and negative reactions are accessible, or when a decision about the attitude object is imminent. Still, more evidence has demonstrated that objective ambivalence is not the only precursor to subjective ambivalence. For example, interpersonal ambivalence, the presence of attitudes which are in conflict with those of important others, independently predicts subjective ambivalence, as does the mere anticipation of information which may conflict with one's preexisting attitude.

Both personal and circumstantial aspects must be considered in order to accurately assess relationship sustainability between subjective and objective ambivalence.

=== Individual differences ===
Individual characteristics are essential in deciding the most beneficial coping strategies. Research has shown that certain personality traits may impact an individual's likelihood of experiencing ambivalence. There are certain personality traits that are not as relevant to ambivalence, such as the need for closure. Other components may alter these traits that may contribute toward ambivalence, such as tolerance to ambiguity. Particularly, those possessing the need for cognition, or the inclination to evaluate the discrepancies between positive and negative emotions, are less likely to experience ambivalence. In other words, the desire to resolve issues, which requires a great deal of cognitive resources, fosters cognitive strength and thus the ability to overcome ambivalence.

Ambivalent attitudes that demonstrate weakness are accessed slower than strong attitudes. This leads to a conflict called response competition; the process of slowing down responses because of the difficulty to choose between positive and negative beliefs and feelings. Bottom-up processing shows how greater cognitive effort entwined with combined beliefs results in non congruent information. Once individuals are confronted several choices, they are then followed by uncertain outcomes. Thus concluding that slower response times may be due to systematic processing.

Individuals with a greater concern for invalidity experience a heightened amount of ambivalence, presumably because they are concerned with making wrongful judgments, and as a result, efforts to adjust attitude become inhibited. Response to ambivalence, then, is affected by an individual's need for consistency; hence, the higher the need for consistency, the more adverse the reaction will be to maintaining two contradictory attitudes simultaneously, whereas someone with a reduced need for consistency will experience less mental frustration Those seeking to rectify inconsistencies and resolve conflict are able to reject ambivalence better than most.

Additionally, some individuals have a more pronounced fear of invalidity than others. When this fear is experienced to a stronger degree, these individuals will not want to acknowledge the ambivalence as it is especially uncomfortable. Since the ambiguity is not being resolved, it will persist within the person. Gebauer, Maio, and Pakizeh discuss the possibility that many perfectionists, despite the seemingly positive qualities exerted, are at risk of neglecting internal inconsistencies. Consequently, it is not unlikely for those individuals to confront a plethora of unexplained, ambivalent feelings.

=== Goal conflicts ===
Ambivalence will emerge when two (or more) goals valued by an individual are in conflict regarding the same attitudinal object. The individual becomes ambivalent about the object to which they both reference, not as much when regarding the individual goals themselves.

Many decisions as common as food consumption or selection can invoke some degree of ambivalence every day. An action can seem to have pleasant outcomes, but it can simultaneously cause issues as well. Emotions or attitudes that are ambivalent may spark both quick and far-off consequences that are inconsistent. A chronic dieter, for example, may experience ambivalence between the goals of eating enjoyment and weight control. Each of these goals independently are viewed as positive, but when conjoined in regards to actually eating more food, the resulting conflict prompts ambivalence. The object of eating enjoyment and the object of losing weight are both regarded with positive attitude, but these two goals are incongruent with each other and are both activated when considering eating.

The goal driven ambivalence that produces several forms of behavior modification may have profound implications on the behaviors and outcomes. Some examples are overcoming addiction, procrastination, health maintenance, and many others. Much of the focus of previous work has been concentrated on pain avoidance and pleasure seeking (focus on the ambivalent object itself), and not enough to the "pleasure" goal objectives related to and driving the conflict. Under certain circumstances, people who are exposed to unpleasant experiences are motivated to decrease unpleasant feelings toward ambivalence. One way to accomplish such a task is by acquiring new knowledge that can result in more immediate conclusions about the attitude object, or result in an adjustment in the individuals attitudes regarding the contributing goals which prompted the conflict.

Ambivalent attitudes that demonstrate weakness are accessed slower than strong attitudes and are thought to have less of an influence on behavior. This leads to a conflict called response competition; the process of slowing down responses because of the difficulty to choose between positive and negative beliefs and feelings. Bottom-up processing shows how greater cognitive effort entwined with combined beliefs results in incongruent information. Once individuals are confronted several choices, they are then followed by uncertain outcomes. Thus concluding that slower response times may be due to systematic processing.

=== Value conflicts ===
Ambivalence is often the result of conflict arising from personal or social values. Different cultures, and the individuals within them, have different values surrounding race, ethnicity, nationality, class, religion or beliefs, sex, sexual orientation, gender identity, age, and health status. Social constructs and perceived norms and values within a given society create contradictory feelings for many individuals. If opposing values are activated by the same object they are likely to clash upon encounter.

Conflicted value items do not need to come from the same category, but to be considered a contributor of ambivalence, discordance must occur.

The attitudinal object of women in the workplace could, for example, be affected by religious or political values. The contributing value systems are both held in positive regard but are opposed to each other in reference to the attitudinal ambivalent item. The amount of ambivalence experienced corresponds to the positive regard of each value contributing to the conflict. In other words, weakly held conflicting values should not generate as much ambivalence as strongly held values.

=== Affective-cognitive ambivalence ===
Affective ambivalence (A+/A-) refers to disparity between feelings, whereas cognitive ambivalence (C+/C-) focuses on the disagreement between beliefs. Together, the notion of affective-cognitive ambivalence (A+/C-) or (A-/C+) embodies the commonly known conundrum of "the heart vs. mind conflict."

When each state is in balance, the influence on attitude is equal (A+/C+). Yet, there is compelling evidence that affect tends to overpower cognition (A+/C-).

That is to say, the degree of ambivalence construed at any given moment can alter the mechanisms by which one views the world. When ambivalent cognitive states become psychologically agonizing, motivation rises to eliminate distress. Under those circumstances, people generally pay more attention to information that is relevant to their ambivalent state, in particular when it is perceived as having the potential to reduce discomfort.

== Consequences of ambivalence as a dimension of attitude strength ==
=== Attitude stability ===
Ambivalence is often conceptualized as a negative predictor of attitude strength. That is, as an attitude becomes more ambivalent, its strength decreases. Strong attitudes are those that are stable over time, resistant to change, and predict behavior and information processing.

Studies have found that ambivalent attitudes are less stable over time, less resistant to change, and less predictive of behavior.

Ambivalent attitudes are subject to change based on the concepts, feelings, or objects that are salient at the time. Since an ambivalent attitude is one in which positive and negative feelings are held simultaneously, the strength of either may wax or wane depending on what context the individual finds themselves in; different aspects of an attitude may be activated across situations.

=== Attitude pliability ===
Ambivalent attitudes are known to be susceptible to persuasion. Since there is less certainty associated with an ambivalent attitude, both facts and trivial information are assessed, assimilated, and determinant of one's attitude. Accordingly, this may bias or persuade an individual's attitude. Strong attitudes, on the other hand, are less likely to be manipulated because they are essentially "anchored in knowledge structures".

Armitage and Conner conducted a study regarding attitudes toward eating a low-fat diet. Attitudes of a high ambivalence group and a low ambivalence group were recorded two times within five months. Following an attitude change intervention the high ambivalence group demonstrated a significant positive change in attitude toward the diet (compared to a control group) whereas the low ambivalence group demonstrated very little change if any.

In situations that highlight one dimension over the other, individuals who are high in ambivalence are more likely to embrace the clear-cut better aspect of the attitude object.

== Ambivalence in clinical psychology ==
=== Bleuler's tripartite scheme ===
The concept of ambivalence was introduced into psychiatric parlance by Eugen Bleuler, who used it in print for the first time in his 1910 article Vortrag über Ambivalenz. Bleuler distinguished three main types of ambivalence: volitional, intellectual, and emotional. Volitional ambivalence refers to an inability to decide on an action—what Montaigne called "a spirit justly balanced betweene two equal desires". The concept (if not Bleuler's term) had a long prehistory, reaching back through Buridan's ass, starving between two equally attractive bales of hay in the Middle Ages, to Aristotle. Intellectual ambivalence—the sceptical belief that "There is no reason but hath a contrary to it" —also follows a long tradition reaching back through Montaigne to Sextus Empiricus and Pyrrho. (Freud considered Bleuler's stress on intellectual ambivalence particularly appropriate given his own ambivalence towards Freud's intellectual constructs, alternatively praising and criticizing them). Emotional ambivalence involved opposing affective attitudes towards the same object, as with the man who both loved and hated his wife.

While mainly dealing with ambivalence in relation to the psychological splitting of schizophrenia, Bleuler also noted how "in the dreams of healthy persons, affective as well as intellectual ambivalence is a common phenomenon".

=== Freudian usage ===
Freud was swift to pick up Bleuler's concept of ambivalence, applying it to areas he had previously dealt with in terms of ambiguous language, or the persistent co-existence of love and hatred aimed at the same person. Freud also extended the scope of Bleuler's term to cover the co-existence of active and passive trends in the same instinctual impulse—what Freud called "pairs of contrary component instincts" such as looking and being looked at.

Karl Abraham explored the presence of ambivalence in mourning—something he thought to be a universal phenomenon. Others in psychoanalysis have traced the roots of contradictory impulses (usually love and hate) to very early stages of psychosexual development.

Defences against feeling both of the two contradictory emotions include psychological repression, isolation and displacement. Thus, for example, an analytic patient's love for his father might be quite consciously experienced and openly expressed—while his "hate" for the same object might be heavily repressed and only indirectly expressed, and thus only revealed in analysis. A drug addict may feel ambivalently about their drug of choice; they are aware of their drug use as a negative-impact agent in their lives (socially, financially, physically, etc.) while simultaneously seeking and using the drug because of the positive-impact results they receive from the drug's usage (the "high"). (More recent discourse of addiction as a mental health concern and chemically-induced/encoded imperative, rather than as a behavioral choice, complicates the notion of ambivalence as it relates to addiction.)

Another relevant distinction is that whereas the psychoanalytic notion of "ambivalence" sees it as engendered by all neurotic conflict, a person's everyday "mixed feelings" may easily be based on a quite realistic assessment of the imperfect nature of the thing being considered.

== Ambivalence in philosophy ==
Philosophers such as Hili Razinsky consider how ambivalence relates to other aspects of the human experience, such as personhood, action, and judgement, and what it means that strict ambivalence is possible.

== See also ==
- Attitude
- Attitude change
- Approach-avoidance conflict
- Cognitive dissonance
- Dialetheism, the principle asserting that some statements are both true and false
- Love–hate relationship
- Persuasion
- Psychoanalytic concepts of love and hate
- Madonna–whore complex
- On-and-off relationship
- Tsundere
