= Paranoid personality disorder =

Personality disorder involving mistrust of others

- Specialty: Psychiatry, clinical psychology
- Symptoms: Paranoia, pervasive suspiciousness, generalized mistrust of others, hypersensitivity, scanning of environments for clues or suggestions that may validate fears or biases
- Risk factors: Adverse childhood experiences, possibly social stress
- Differential diagnosis: Delusional disorder, schizophrenia; a bipolar or depressive disorder with psychotic symptoms; schizotypal, schizoid, borderline, histrionic, narcissistic, and avoidant personality disorders
- Frequency: Prevalence estimated to range from 2.1%–4.4%

Paranoid personality disorder (PPD) is a personality disorder characterized by paranoia, and a pervasive, long-standing suspiciousness and generalized mistrust of others.

Outlined in the main chapter on personality disorders in the Diagnostic and Statistical Manual of Mental Disorders (DSM), paranoid personality disorder is not specifically included in the Alternative DSM-5 Model for Personality Disorders (AMPD), nor in the eleventh revision (ICD-11) of the International Classification of Diseases; the latter two instead classify it in accordance with a dimensional approach to personality disorders.

The exact causes of PPD remain unknown, with research on this matter being limited; adverse childhood experiences are known to be a risk factor. Treatment of this disorder takes the forms of pharmacotherapy and psychotherapy; there are however no medications approved specifically for PPD and research on psychotherapeutic interventions is lacking.

== Signs and symptoms ==
People with this disorder may be hypersensitive, easily insulted, and habitually relate to the world by vigilant scanning of the environment for clues or suggestions that may validate their fears or biases. They are eager observers and they often think they are in danger and look for signs and threats of that danger, potentially not appreciating other interpretations or evidence.

They tend to be guarded and suspicious and have quite constricted emotional lives. Their reduced capacity for meaningful emotional involvement and the general pattern of isolated withdrawal often lend a quality of loneliness to their life experience. People with PPD may have a tendency to bear grudges, suspiciousness, tendency to interpret others' actions as hostile, persistent tendency to self-reference, or a tenacious sense of personal right.

== Causes ==
The causes of paranoid personality disorder have not been studied extensively. At the same time, there are studied causes of personality disorders in general; these include social, biological, psychological and developmental factors. Adverse childhood experiences are a risk factor for PPD, predominantly in the form of child abuse, itself occurring in various forms such as physical, sexual, and emotional abuse. Social stress may be another risk factor.

A genetic contribution to paranoid traits and a possible genetic link between this personality disorder and schizophrenia exist. A large long-term Norwegian twin study found paranoid personality disorder to be modestly heritable and to share a portion of its genetic and environmental risk factors with the other cluster A personality disorders, schizoid and schizotypal.

Psychosocial theories implicate projection of negative internal feelings and parental modeling. Cognitive theorists believe the disorder to be a result of an underlying belief that other people are unfriendly in combination with a lack of self-awareness.

== Diagnosis ==
=== Assessment ===
Special care is necessary when interviewing people with PPD, stemming from their anticipation of exploitation and harm. This leads them to look for hidden, malevolent intent behind the interviewer's questions and their possible kindness, or a fear that what they disclose "will be used against them". They may perceive sudden transitions in the interview as threatening. In order not to be vulnerable, they maintain a tense demeanor and are hypervigilant. Alongside suspiciousness, hypervigilance, and a withdrawn demeanor, people with PPD may also display hostility with argumentation or accusations.

=== Classification ===
Classification of personality disorders differs significantly between the frameworks incorporated into the Diagnostic and Statistical Manual of Mental Disorders (DSM) and International Classification of Diseases (ICD). The DSM-5 includes two distinct diagnostic models for personality disorders; its main body (Section II) retains a traditional, categorical model of 10 putatively distinct PDs, whereas the hybrid categorical–dimensional Alternative DSM-5 Model for Personality Disorders (AMPD) is based on impairment in personality functioning as well as pathological personality traits, based on which PD diagnoses are constructed. In the ICD-11, a dimensional model of personality disorders is implemented. Similarly to the AMPD, it is based on severity and pathological traits; however, it does not classify PD as types, and characterization of the disorder through trait qualifiers is optional.

In its main, categorical classification of personality disorders, located in section II, the DSM-5 categorizes personality disorders into three clusters. Belonging to Cluster A, PPD is characterized as a "pervasive distrust and suspiciousness of others such that their motives are interpreted as malevolent". It is operationalized through seven symptoms, at least four of which must be present; as well as it not being attributable to a psychotic disorder or other medical conditions. The AMPD, meanwhile, does not include PPD as its own diagnostic entity; instead, it is diagnosed as personality disorder – trait specified, which is a dimensional diagnosis that is constructed from the individual expression of personalty disorder, as manifested in both a general impairment in personality functioning along with at least one pathological personality trait. Such traits that may be used for characterization of PPD are suspiciousness, restricted affectivity, and hostility.

The ICD-11 classification of personality disorders has replaced the categorical classification of personality disorders in the ICD-10, introducing a dimensional model containing a unified personality disorder with severity specifiers, along with specifiers for prominent personality traits or patterns. Severity is assessed based on the degree and pervasiveness of disturbance in the person’s relationships and their sense of self; the intensity and breadth of the emotional, cognitive and behavioral manifestations of the person’s disturbance; the extent to which these patterns and problems cause distress or psychosocial impairment; and the level of risk of harm to self and others. Trait and pattern specifiers are used for recording the manner in which the disturbance is manifested. Paranoid personality disorder is primarily associated with the ICD-11 trait domains Negative Affectivity and Dissociality. The former reflects core features such as mistrust and suspicion, while the latter relates to hostility, self-righteousness, and a tendency toward self-centeredness. Some studies also report a link to Detachment, consistent with prior research and theoretical models. The previous revision, ICD-10, included paranoid personality disorder as its own entity.

=== Differential diagnosis ===
When paranoid personality disorder is considered, a differential diagnosis is supposed to be conducted in order to ascertain that it is the correct diagnosis. Per the DSM-5-TR, this includes both other personality disorders and several disorders involving psychotic symptoms. Moreover, PPD is to be differentiated from symptoms stemming from substance use disorders and from personality change due to another medical condition; differing in course and presentation, acquired brain injury and Alzheimer's disease may also give rise to paranoid ideation. People who develop paranoid traits alongside a physical disability, such as hearing loss, should also not receive a diagnosis of PPD.

Psychotic disorders that PPD is to be distinguished from differ from it through the presence of psychotic symptoms such as hallucinations and delusions; these are not part of PPD. Schizophrenia, delusional disorder involving persecutory delusions, as well as bipolar or depressive disorders with psychotic features are such disorders. Paranoid personality disorder is only applicable in case its manifestation preceded the emergence of psychotic symptoms and persists after remission of these symptoms.

Unless deemed comorbid due to their criteria also being met, other personality disorders can be distinguished from paranoid personality disorder based on specific characteristic differences. Schizotypal personality disorder differs from PPD in it involving unusual perception, speech and thought as well as magical thinking, while they share social withdrawal, paranoid ideation and suspiciousness. The latter is not central to histrionic and borderline personality disorders, which also tend to involve anger in response to minor stimuli; nor is paranoid ideation commonly significant in schizoid personality disorder, which shares detachment with PPD. Reticence in people with narcissistic and avoidant personality disorders tends to stem from fear of others discovering their imperfections. People with PPD may be driven to antisocial behavior by vengefulness; this is different from the intent to obtain personal gain seen in antisocial personality disorder.

== Treatment ==
Treatment of paranoid personality disorder can be challenging, as individuals with this disorder are reluctant to find help and have difficulty trusting others. They may lack insight into their disorder, and may not experience internal distress. Due to the impact of their behaviors of people around them, they may be persuaded by family members to enter treatment. Partly as a result of tendencies to mistrust others, there have been few studies conducted over the treatment of paranoid personality disorder.

Currently, there are no medications approved by the U.S. Food and Drug Administration (FDA) for treating PPD; but antidepressants, antipsychotics, and mood stabilizers may be prescribed under wrong assumptions to treat some of the symptoms. The effects on aggression of the aforementioned medications have been studied in the case of borderline personality disorder (BPD), for which there are also no medications approved by the FDA; the results indicate that "antipsychotics as a class do not have a large effect on aggression", which in turn indicates that treatments for psychosis are not effective for treatment of PPD. Paranoid ideation can be ameliorated by second-generation antipsychotics.

Another form of treatment of PPD is psychoanalysis, normally used in cases where both PPD and BPD are present. However, no published studies directly state the effectiveness of this form of treatment on specifically PPD, as opposed to its effects on BPD. Cognitive behavioral therapy (CBT) has also been suggested as a possible treatment to paranoid personality disorder, but while case studies have shown improvement in the symptoms of the disorder, no systematic/widespread data has been collected to support this. A recent meta-analysis revealed that no specific randomized controlled trials (RCTs) currently focus solely on PPD. Instead, PPD was merely one of several possible diagnoses in a small number of existing trials, resulting in a minimal count of relevant recruited patients (e.g., an RCT on Schema Therapy), or constituted the primary diagnosis in a few individual cases or case series (e.g., a seven-case series on Evolutionary Systems Therapy).

== Epidemiology ==
The estimated prevalence of PPD ranges from 2.1% to 4.4%. It is seen in 2–10% of psychiatric outpatients, while in inpatients the prevalence range is 10–30%. In clinical samples men have higher rates, whereas epidemiologically there is a reported higher rate of women.

It is estimated that 75% of people with PPD also have another, comorbid personality disorder, with the most common ones being avoidant and borderline personality disorders, followed by narcissistic personality disorder. Schizoid and schizotypal personality disorders also frequently present alongside PPD. In addition, agoraphobia, anxiety disorders, major depressive disorder, obsessive–compulsive disorder and substance use disorders are other possibly comorbid disorders that may be indicated by anxious and depressive symptoms.

== History ==
Paranoid personality disorder is listed in the DSM-5 and was included in all previous versions of the DSM. One of the earliest descriptions of the paranoid personality comes from the French psychiatrist Valentin Magnan who described a "fragile personality" that showed idiosyncratic thinking, hypochondriasis, undue sensitivity, referential thinking, and suspiciousness.

Closely related to this description is Emil Kraepelin's description from 1905 of a pseudo-querulous personality who is "always on the alert to find grievance, but without delusions", vain, self-absorbed, sensitive, irritable, litigious, obstinate, and living at strife with the world. In 1921, he renamed the condition paranoid personality and described these people as distrustful, feeling unjustly treated and feeling subjected to hostility, interference and oppression. He also observed a contradiction in these personalities: on the one hand, they stubbornly hold on to their unusual ideas, on the other hand, they often accept every piece of gossip as the truth. Kraepelin also noted that paranoid personalities were often present in people who later developed paranoid psychosis. Subsequent writers also considered traits like suspiciousness and hostility to predispose people to developing delusional illnesses, particularly "late paraphrenias" of old age.

Following Kraepelin, Eugen Bleuler described "contentious psychopathy" or "paranoid constitution" as displaying the characteristic triad of suspiciousness, grandiosity, and feelings of persecution. He also emphasized that these people's false assumptions do not attain the form of real delusion.

Ernst Kretschmer emphasized the sensitive inner core of the paranoia-prone personality: they feel shy and inadequate but at the same time they have an attitude of entitlement. They attribute their failures to the machinations of others but secretly to their own inadequacy. They experience constant tension between feelings of self-importance and experiencing the environment as unappreciative and humiliating.

Karl Jaspers, a German phenomenologist, described "self-insecure" personalities who resemble the paranoid personality. According to Jaspers, such people experience inner humiliation, brought about by outside experiences and their interpretations of them. They have an urge to get external confirmation to their self-deprecation and that makes them see insults in the behavior of other people. They suffer from every slight because they seek the real reason for them in themselves. This kind of insecurity leads to overcompensation: compulsive formality, strict social observances, and exaggerated displays of assurance.

In 1950, Kurt Schneider described the "fanatic psychopaths" and divided them into two categories: the combative type that is very insistent about his false notions and actively quarrelsome, and the eccentric type that is passive, secretive, vulnerable to esoteric sects, but nonetheless suspicious about others.

The descriptions of Leonhard and Sheperd from the sixties describe paranoid people as overvaluing their abilities and attributing their failure to the ill-will of others; they also mention that their interpersonal relations are disturbed and they are in constant conflict with others.

In 1975, Polatin described the paranoid personality as rigid, suspicious, watchful, self-centered and selfish, inwardly hypersensitive, but emotionally undemonstrative. However, when there is a difference of opinion, the underlying mistrust, authoritarianism, and rage burst through.

In the 1980s, paranoid personality disorder received little attention, and when it did receive it, the focus was on its potential relationship to paranoid schizophrenia. The most significant contribution of this decade comes from Theodore Millon who divided the features of paranoid personality disorder to four categories:

1. Behavioral characteristics of vigilance, abrasive irritability, and counterattack
2. Complaints indicating oversensitivity, social isolation, and mistrust
3. The dynamics of denying personal insecurities, attributing these to others, and self-inflation through grandiose fantasies
4. Coping style of detesting dependence and hostile distancing of oneself from others

== Controversy ==
Due to repeated concerns of the validity of PPD and poor empirical evidence, it has been suggested that PPD be removed from the DSM.

== See also ==
- Delusions of reference
- Paranoid anxiety
- Persecutory delusions

== Bibliography ==
- Akhtar, Salman (January 1990). "Paranoid Personality Disorder: A Synthesis of Developmental, Dynamic, and Descriptive Features". American Journal of Psychotherapy. 44 (1): 5–25. doi:10.1176/appi.psychotherapy.1990.44.1.5. ISSN 0002-9564.
- American Psychiatric Association (2013). "Paranoid Personality Disorder". Diagnostic and statistical manual of mental disorders (5th ed.). Washington, D.C.: American Psychiatric Publishing. pp. 649–652. ISBN 978-0-89042-555-8. OCLC 830807378.
- Clark, Lee Anna (2025-05-01). "Wherefrom and Whither PD? Recent Developments and Future Possibilities in DSM-5 and ICD-11 Personality Disorder Diagnosis". Current Psychiatry Reports. 27 (5): 267–277. doi:10.1007/s11920-025-01602-y. ISSN 1535-1645. PMC 12003573. PMID 40108080. This article incorporates text from this source, which is available under the CC BY 4.0 license.
- Jain, Lakshit; Torrico, Tyler J. (2024), "Paranoid Personality Disorder", StatPearls, Treasure Island (FL): StatPearls Publishing, PMID 39163470
- Lee, Royce J. (2017-06-01). "Mistrustful and Misunderstood: a Review of Paranoid Personality Disorder". Current Behavioral Neuroscience Reports. 4 (2): 151–165. doi:10.1007/s40473-017-0116-7. ISSN 2196-2979. PMC 5793931. PMID 29399432.
- Rodriguez-Seijas, Craig; Ruggero, Camilo; Eaton, Nicholas R.; Krueger, Robert F. (2019). "The DSM-5 Alternative Model for Personality Disorders and Clinical Treatment: a Review". Current Treatment Options in Psychiatry. 6 (4): 284–298. doi:10.1007/s40501-019-00187-7. ISSN 2196-3061.
- Schulte Holthausen, Barbara; Habel, Ute (2018). "Sex Differences in Personality Disorders". Current Psychiatry Reports. 20 (12) 107. doi:10.1007/s11920-018-0975-y. ISSN 1523-3812. PMID 30306417.
- Simon, Jonatan; Lambrecht, Bastian; Bach, Bo (2023-04-06). "Cross-walking personality disorder types to ICD-11 trait domains: An overview of current findings". Frontiers in Psychiatry. 14 1175425. doi:10.3389/fpsyt.2023.1175425. ISSN 1664-0640. PMC 10116048. PMID 37091704.
- Sperry, Len (2016). "Paranoid Personality Disorder". Handbook of diagnosis and treatment of DSM-5 personality disorders: assessment, case conceptualization, and treatment (Third ed.). New York, NY: Routledge, Taylor & Francis Group. pp. 206–225. doi:10.4324/9780203763728. ISBN 978-0-415-84191-7. LCCN 2015040215.
- Swales, Michaela A. (2022-12-15). "Personality Disorder Diagnoses in ICD-11: Transforming Conceptualisations and Practice". Clinical Psychology in Europe. 4 (Spec Issue) e9635. doi:10.32872/cpe.9635. ISSN 2625-3410. PMC 9881116. PMID 36760321. This article incorporates text from this source, which is available under the CC BY 4.0 license.
- Triebwasser, Joseph; Chemerinski, Eran; Roussos, Panos; Siever, Larry J. (2013). "Paranoid Personality Disorder". Journal of Personality Disorders. 27 (6): 795–805. doi:10.1521/pedi_2012_26_055. ISSN 0885-579X. PMID 22928850.
- Waugh, Mark H.; Hopwood, Christopher J.; Krueger, Robert F.; Morey, Leslie C.; Pincus, Aaron L.; Wright, Aidan G. C. (2017). "Psychological assessment with the DSM–5 Alternative Model for Personality Disorders: Tradition and innovation". Professional Psychology: Research and Practice. 48 (2): 79–89. doi:10.1037/pro0000071. ISSN 1939-1323. PMC 5403154. PMID 28450760.
