= Paranoid-schizoid and depressive positions =

Theory of children's mental state

In development psychology, Melanie Klein proposed a "(psychic) position theory" instead of a "(psychic) stage theory".

== Paranoid-schizoid position ==
In object relations theory, the paranoid-schizoid position is a state of mind of children, from birth to four or six months of age.

Melanie Klein has described the earliest stages of infantile psychic life in terms of a successful completion of development through certain positions. A position, for Klein, is a set of psychic functions that correspond to a given phase of development, always appearing during the first year of life, but which are present at all times thereafter and can be reactivated at any time. There are two major positions: the paranoid-schizoid position and the subsequent depressive position. The earlier more primitive position is the paranoid-schizoid position and if an individual's environment and up-bringing are satisfactory, she or he will progress through the depressive position.

The paranoid-schizoid position is considered the state of mind of children from birth to four or six months of age. Although this position develops into the next position, it is normal to move back and forward between the two positions although some people operate in the paranoid schizoid position for much of the time. As one of the originators of Object Relations theory, Klein sees emotions as always related to other people or objects of emotions. Relations during these first months are not to whole objects but only to part objects, such as the breast, the mother's hands, her face etc.

Paranoid refers to the central paranoid anxiety, the fear of invasive malevolence. This is experienced as coming from the outside, but ultimately derives from the projection out of the death instinct. Paranoid anxiety can be understood in terms of anxiety about imminent annihilation and derives from a sense of the destructive or death instinct of the child. In this position before the secure internalisation of a good object to protect the ego, the immature ego deals with its anxiety by splitting off bad feelings and projecting them out. However, this causes paranoia. Schizoid refers to the central defense mechanism: splitting, the vigilant separation of the good object from the bad object.

Klein posited that a healthy development implies that the infant has to split its external world, its objects and itself into two categories: good (i.e., gratifying, loved, loving) and bad (i.e. frustrating, hated, persecutory). This splitting makes it possible to introject and identify with the good. In other words: splitting in this stage is useful because it protects the good from being destroyed by the bad. Later, when the ego has developed sufficiently, the bad can be integrated, and ambivalence and conflict can be tolerated.

Later, with greater maturity and the resolution of the depressive position, the ego is able to bring together the good and bad object, which leads to whole object relations. Achieving this involves mourning the loss of the idealised object, and associated depressive anxieties.

Klein described development as proceeding through two phases: the paranoid-schizoid position and the depressive position. In the paranoid-schizoid position, the main anxiety is paranoia and hypochondria, and the fear is for the self.

When things are going well, the mother is experienced as an all benign figure. However, inevitably when needs or desires of the young baby are not immediately met by the mother, because she is not there to fulfill them, the absence of the good object is experienced as the presence of the bad object.

The bad object is then hated and attacked in phantasies. The hated frustrating object quickly becomes persecutory as it is imagined to get revenge in a similar way to how it is being treated. This is why the baby feels persecuted, hence the "paranoid" in paranoid schizoid.

As well as the bad (aggressive, hateful) parts of the self deriving from the death instinct being projected onto the object, goodness is also projected onto the object. It is easier to see why badness is projected outside the self rather than it being felt to be within. It is more difficult to understand why goodness also may be projected out. The reason for this is that when the person does not feel that they can sustain goodness themselves, it is safer to project it into the object. This is the basis for idealisation, and it can be useful in certain situations, e.g. idealising a surgeon who is operating.

The projection of badness into the object is the basis of racism, homophobia, or any other irrational hatred of another group seen as (but essentially not being) different from the self, e.g. estate agents, liberals, conservatives, cyclists, car drivers, Northerners, Southerners, traffic wardens, etc.

Over time the baby becomes more able to tolerate frustration and hold on to the good object for increasing periods, enabling the baby to tolerate its own bad impulses without fear that these will destroy it. This enables a more realistic view of the self and object as possessing both good and bad attributes, leading to the greater integration and maturity of the depressive position.

Klein emphasizes that the good and bad parts of the self are projected onto or into the object. This represents the operation of the life and death drive, of love and hate.

== Depressive position ==
Klein saw the depressive position as an important developmental milestone that continues to mature throughout the life span. The splitting and part object relations that characterize the earlier phase are succeeded by the capacity to perceive that the other who frustrates is also the one who gratifies. Schizoid defenses are still in evidence, but feelings of guilt, grief, and the desire for reparation gain dominance in the developing mind.

In the depressive position, the infant is able to experience others as whole, which radically alters object relationships from the earlier phase. "Before the depressive position, a good object is not in any way the same thing as a bad object. It is only in the depressive position that polar qualities can be seen as different aspects of the same object." Increasing nearness of good and bad brings a corresponding integration of ego.

In a development which Grotstein terms the "primal split", the infant becomes aware of separateness from the mother. This awareness allows guilt to arise in response to the infant's previous aggressive phantasies when bad was split from good. The mother's temporary absences allow for continuous restoration of her "as an image of representation" in the infant mind. Symbolic thought may now arise, and can only emerge once access to the depressive position has been obtained. With the awareness of the primal split, a space is created in which the symbol, the symbolized, and the experiencing subject coexist. History, subjectivity, interiority, and empathy all become possible.

The anxieties characteristic of the depressive position shift from a fear of being destroyed to a fear of destroying others. In fact or phantasy, one now realizes the capacity to harm or drive away a person who one ambivalently loves. The defenses characteristic of the depressive position include the manic defenses, repression and reparation. The manic defenses are the same defenses evidenced in the paranoid-schizoid position, but now mobilized to protect the mind from depressive anxiety. As the depressive position brings about an increasing integration in the ego, earlier defenses change in character, becoming less intense and allowing increasing awareness of psychic reality.

In working through depressive anxiety, projections are withdrawn, allowing the other more autonomy, reality, and a separate existence. The infant, whose destructive phantasies were directed towards the bad mother who frustrated, now begins to realize that bad and good, frustrating and satiating, it is always the same mother. Unconscious guilt for destructive phantasies arises in response to the continuing love and attention provided by caretakers.

[As] fears of losing the loved one become active, a very important step is made in the development. These feelings of guilt and distress now enter as a new element into the emotion of love. They become an inherent part of love, and influence it profoundly both in quality and quantity.

From this developmental milestone come a capacity for sympathy, responsibility to and concern for others, and an ability to identify with the subjective experience of people one cares about. With the withdrawal of the destructive projections, repression of the aggressive impulses takes place. The child allows caretakers a more separate existence, which facilitates increasing differentiation of inner and outer reality. Omnipotence is lessened, which corresponds to a decrease in guilt and the fear of loss.

When all goes well, the developing child is able to comprehend that external others are autonomous people with their own needs and subjectivity.

Previously, extended absences of the object (the good breast, the mother) was experienced as persecutory, and, according to the theory of unconscious phantasy, the persecuted infant phantisizes destruction of the bad object. The good object who then arrives is not the object which did not arrive. Likewise, the infant who destroyed the bad object is not the infant who loves the good object.

In phantasy, the good internal mother can be psychically destroyed by the aggressive impulses. It is crucial that the real parental figures are around to demonstrate the continuity of their love. In this way, the child perceives that what happens to good objects in phantasy does not happen to them in reality. Psychic reality is allowed to evolve as a place separate from the literalness of the physical world.

Through repeated experience with good enough parenting, the internal image that the child has of external others, that is the child's internal object, is modified by experience and the image transforms, merging experiences of good and bad which becomes more similar to the real object (e.g. the mother, who can be both good and bad). In Freudian terms, the pleasure principle is modified by the reality principle.

Melanie Klein saw this surfacing from the depressive position as a prerequisite for social life. Moreover, she viewed the establishment of an inside and an outside world as the start of interpersonal relationships.

Klein argued that people who never succeed in working through the depressive position in their childhood will, as a result, continue to struggle with this problem in adult life. For example: the cause that a person may maintain suffering from intense guilt feelings over the death of a loved one may be found in the unworked- through depressive position. The guilt is there because of a lack of differentiation between phantasy and reality. It also functions as a defense mechanism to defend the self against unbearable feelings of sadness and sorrow, and the internal object of the loved one against the unbearable rage of the self, which, it is feared, could destroy the internal object forever.

== Further thinking regarding the positions ==
Wilfred Bion articulates the dynamic nature of the positions, a point emphasised by Thomas Ogden, and expanded by John Steiner in terms of '"The equilibrium between the paranoid-schizoid and the depressive positions"'. Ogden and James Grotstein have continued to explore early infantile states of mind, and incorporating the work of Donald Meltzer, Esther Bick and others, postulate a position preceding the paranoid-schizoid. Grotstein, following Bion, also hypothesizes a transcendent position which emerges following attainment of the depressive position. This aspect of both Ogden and Grotstein's work remains controversial for many within classical object relations theory.

== See also ==
- Splitting (psychology)
- Object relations theory
