= Suttie =

Suttie is a surname of Scottish origin. It came from either Suddie in Black Isle or Suthie in Perthshire. The surname was derived from the Old English 'suth' meaning 'south', or the Old Norse 'suthr', southern, plus the Scandinavian 'ey', an island, or piece of firm land in a fen.

== Notable people ==
- Alania Suttie (born 1999), Samoan swimmer
- Alison Suttie, Baroness Suttie (born 1968), British politician
- Angus Suttie (1946–1993), Scottish ceramist
- Elsie Grant Suttie (1879–1954), Scottish golfer
- Sir George Suttie, 3rd Baronet (1915–1783), Scottish politician
- Grant-Suttie baronets
- Heather Suttie (born 1973), Scottish radio presenter
- Ian Dishart Suttie (1889–1935), Scottish psychiatrist
- Isy Suttie (born 1978), English musician
- Jack Suttie (born 1934), Australian athlete
- Jason Suttie (born 1973), New Zealand kickboxer
- Lady Susan Harriet Grant-Suttie (1837–1909), Scottish noblewoman and philanthropist
- Taryn Suttie (born 1990), Canadian track and field athlete
