= Splitting (psychology) =

Failure to think in nuances

Splitting, also called binary thinking, dichotomous thinking, black-and-white thinking, all-or-nothing thinking, or thinking in extremes, is the failure in a person's thinking to bring together the dichotomy of both perceived positive and negative qualities of something into a cohesive, realistic whole.

It is a common defense mechanism, wherein the individual tends to think in extremes (e.g., an individual's actions and motivations are all good or all bad with no middle ground). This kind of dichotomous interpretation is contrasted by an acknowledgement of certain nuances known as "shades of gray". Splitting can include different contexts, as individuals who use this defense mechanism may "split" representations of their own mind, of their own personality, and of others. Splitting is observed in personality disorders belonging to cluster B, such as borderline personality disorder and narcissistic personality disorder, as well as schizophrenia and depression. In dissociative identity disorder, the term splitting is used to refer to a split in personality alter-egos.

== History ==
Splitting was first described by Ronald Fairbairn in his formulation of object relations theory in 1952; it begins as the inability of the infant to combine the fulfilling aspects of the parents (the good object) and their unresponsive aspects (the unsatisfying object) into the same individuals, instead seeing the good and bad as separate. In psychoanalytic theory this functions as a defense mechanism. Splitting was also described by Hyppolyte Taine in 1878 who described splitting as a splitting of the ego. He described this as the existence of two thoughts, wills, distinct actions simultaneously within an individual who is aware of one mind without the awareness of the other.

== Mechanism ==
Splitting people, ideas, and things into categories of either good or bad can be typically seen in childhood development, but "is expected to recede once the child has developed the capacity to understand primary caretakers as simultaneously possessing both good and bad qualities."

The individual will often perceive something that contradicts with their image of themselves or a person close to them as a rejection or slight, a perceived attempt to isolate or abandon them, or even a feeling of unwanted attraction. Psychoanalytic theories propose the idea that idealization and devaluation means there is polarization in not only an individual's model of self, but their perceived view of others as well.

Individuals with borderline personality disorder have been shown to interpret social acceptance as subterfuge or deception. They have also been shown to be less sensitive to verbal irony due to a negative bias in interpreting ambiguous information. Individuals diagnosed with borderline personality disorder may also believe that they will be abandoned if they trust anyone around them.

Such an individual will feel challenged by this discomfort as it relates to their self-perception and will form a narrative to explain and externalize the perceived discomfort, making it wholly the fault of another. Proneness to rejection hypersensitivity, problems in establishing and maintaining consistent and appropriate levels of trust in interpersonal relationships, and frequent misinterpretation of social signals contribute greatly to such an individual's ability to find supporting "evidence" for their devaluation process. This can be exacerbated in times of professional or personal stress. Splitting can also result in dispositional and situational attributes of others' actions. This means that both a liked person's good behavior and an unliked person's bad behavior are both dispositional attributes; however, a good person's bad behavior would be situational and attributed to symptoms like stress or intoxication.

The individual will then devalue the person that they once idealised. Often then the splitting process becomes behavioral and the subject will often abruptly lash out or cut contact with the person that they now devalue, causing a great deal of inner group conflict and distress. In order to prevent perceived judgement from others, the subject will often engage in a stage of justification of their actions by convincing those around them of the validity of their claims that the devalued party is entirely bad and that they are purely a victim.

With people with Cluster B personality disorders, this often involves the embellishment or invention of grievances that garner an emotional response from those around them that they feel matches their own distress at the situation. The more valuable the social bond they are trying to preserve or the higher their general need for social acceptance, the higher the probability that they engage in psychologically abusive behavior. This can cause intense psychological distress in the person they are devaluing and can be met by legal challenges of abuse or slander.

Splitting also impacts self-esteem, as the dichotomous good or bad thinking is applied to an individual's own self image and how they perceive themselves.

== Management ==
For the loved ones of those with borderline personality disorder there are several seemingly contradictory factors to balance:

- Privacy of the subject versus seeking external help
- Acknowledging the subject's emotions while not endorsing or encouraging their behavior
- Helping the subject navigate their episode while not protecting them from the consequences of their actions.

The New England Personality Disorder Association recommends always involving the wider group in the discussion of issues, not responding to or ignoring threats or accusations (even if untrue) in the moment, and then discussing the episode in an open and realistic manner when the subject has calmed, and never protecting the subject from social or legal consequences of their actions.

Certain difficulties arise from validating emotions and not endorsing the behavior of splitting, as the loved ones of the person with borderline personality disorder risks could become complicit in both the problematic behaviors themselves and their reinforcement.

Examples provided by Gunderson and Berkowitz are:

- If the subject were to steal from someone they believe owes them money, it is not appropriate to shield them from prosecution
- If the subject attacks another inappropriately (either physically or verbally), it is not appropriate to condone this behaviour in order to avoid conflict.

Dialectical behavior therapy (DBT) is the most known treatment for those with BPD who did not thrive in cognitive behavioral therapy (CBT). This type of therapy proposes that those with BPD can more effectively manage their interactions with others by acquiring skills that better help them deal with stress, regulate emotions, and have quality relationships. This therapy includes one weekly hour of individual therapy, a two-hour group training session, communication outside of sessions, and a consultation team created for the therapist.

Mentalization-based treatment (MBT) is a therapy that proposes that symptoms in individuals with BPD form when the patient stops mentalizing, meaning they stop rationally thinking about the emotions in their own minds and others' minds. This leads individuals to disconnect from reality and operate from the certainty they feel about others' motives. MBT strengthens an individual's capability to operate under attachment stress. Therapists encourage patients to dig into their emotional and unrealistic thoughts and actions in a more grounded and open mindset and thought process. MBT encourages individuals to think in a hyperactive state of mind within themselves instead of the internalized insights that they create of the world.

Transference focused psychotherapy is a therapy that focuses on the interpersonal dynamics of the lives of individuals and what happens during their emotional states. Their interpersonal dynamic is brought out during therapy and later studied to resolve what the good and bad splits may affect an individuals personal lives. This mechanism helps individuals reach a more balanced way of thinking about themselves and about others.

Schema-focused therapy is a type of cognitive therapy that focuses on structural changes that may occur in an individual's life. This involves two weekly therapy sessions in which the therapist administers behavioral, experimental, and cognitive practices that focus on the individual's everyday life and activities that occur within it including any past traumatic experiences that may have occurred. This therapy works by changing the individual's way of negative thinking and believing into a healthier more functional way of thinking.

General psychiatric management focuses on individuals' lives outside of whatever therapy they may receive. It prioritizes their ability to function normally in their relationships and in their social functioning. By discussing an individual's symptoms and prognosis, therapists can create a plan for treatment.

== Relationships ==
Splitting creates instability in relationships because one person can be viewed as either personified virtue or personified vice at different times, depending on whether they gratify the subject's needs or frustrate them. This, along with similar oscillations in the experience and appraisal of the self, leads to chaotic and unstable relationship patterns, identity diffusion, and mood swings. The therapeutic process can be greatly impeded by these oscillations because the therapist too can come to be seen as all good or all bad. To attempt to overcome the negative effects on treatment outcomes, constant interpretations by the therapist are needed.

Splitting contributes to unstable relationships and intense emotional experiences. Splitting is common during adolescence, but is regarded as transient. It has been noted especially in persons diagnosed with BPD. Treatment strategies have been developed for individuals and groups based on DBT, and for couples. There are also self-help books on related topics such as mindfulness and emotional regulation that claim to be helpful for individuals who struggle with the consequences of splitting. The fear of incurring the social consequences of splitting has been theorised to lead people with BPD to avoid social or romantic relationships with those they perceive to be critical and/or prone to assertive or aggressive behaviour and conversely seek out individuals they perceive to be passive.

Many in relationships with individuals who struggle with splitting have stated that they feel as though they "tip-toe" through their relationship because there is a constant sense of duty and worrying that their partner will split and begin to see them as the "bad guy". Individuals have expressed the need to consistently validate and make sure their partner is understood due to their struggles with interpersonal identity and lack of self-worth. Hypersensitivity is one feature of BPD that caused individuals to both idolize and devalue the people they surround themselves with due to their fear of rejection. This is also expressed by an individual's need for intimacy followed by a fear of rejection and interpersonal aggression. Interpersonal rejection is a split response to the feeling of rejection that an individual may feel which can result in problems within friendships and relationships because of a disruption in an individual's interpersonal functioning.

== Disorders ==
=== Autism spectrum disorder ===
Dichotomous or black and white thinking is a common feature of autism spectrum disorder.

=== Borderline personality disorder ===
Splitting is a relatively common defense mechanism for people with borderline personality disorder (BPD). One of the DSM IV-TR criteria for this disorder is a description of splitting: "a pattern of unstable and intense interpersonal relationships characterized by alternating between extremes of idealization and devaluation". In psychoanalytic theory, people with BPD are not able to integrate the good and bad images of both self and others, resulting in a bad representation which dominates the good representation.

People with BPD are especially prone to splitting, causing the breakdown of social relationships, as they often seek positions of control in social situations, are hypersensitive to criticism, are prone to paranoia, and have an intense need for social acceptance. Additionally, they often have "domineering, intrusive, and vindictive styles of relating to others correlated with perpetrating psychological aggression", thus reducing their ability to resolve conflicts amicably.

In CBT, the instability that characterizes BPD is seen to come from patterns of thoughts, feelings, and memories that are maladaptive. The back and forth splitting of idealization and devaluation is a unique feature of BPD and NPD. Splitting may cause individuals to believe that they will be abused if they put trust in someone which can result in a simplistic view of how other people think and act. It is also seen as an over simplistic way that individuals with BPD interpret the motives that others may have when it comes to themselves and their well-being.

=== Narcissistic personality disorder ===
People matching the diagnostic criteria for narcissistic personality disorder also use splitting as a central defense mechanism. Most often narcissists do this as an attempt to stabilize their sense of self-positivity in order to preserve their self-esteem, by perceiving themselves as purely upright or admirable and others who do not conform to their will or values as purely wicked or contemptible.

The cognitive habit of splitting also implies the use of other related defense mechanisms, namely idealization and devaluation, which are preventive attitudes or reactions to narcissistic rage and narcissistic injury. The heightened sense of self idealization in splitting can create an inflated sense of self where individuals view themselves as doing no wrong and placing all blame and aggression on others.

The main components of narcissistic personality disorder includes an extreme sensitivity to criticism due to their "do no wrong" ideas of self, developing a sense of entitlement compared to those around them, issues within their relationship lives, feeling like they are unique and different, a developed need to be admired by those around them, a lack of empathy, and a lack of impulse and anger control. These characteristics can cause someone with NPD to split at any time with either one or all characteristics simultaneously based on who they are around at the time and how they interpret the way they are being treated.

=== Schizophrenia ===
In schizophrenia, the term splitting is described as mental fragmentation or a loosening of their mental associations. They are shown to have a lower ability to retrieve information solely from memory and make slower physical and mental decisions. Splitting in schizophrenia is likely related to a decrease in amygdala activity and a lack of control of the prefrontal cortex which may reflect an inability to express feelings and emotions.

Unlike BPD and NPD, splitting in schizophrenia is not characterized by a split of the ego like thoughts of all good or all bad, grandiosity, or a sense of entitlement. Instead, splitting in schizophrenia is characterized by a split of consciousness in which an individual may exhibit psychopathological manifestations due to their decreased mental tensions and inhibited brain activity. This can also lead to individuals integrating their memories which is where their brain activities and memory combine and overlap that creates memories that are made up of one another.

=== Depression ===
As a defense mechanism, the tendency to split may also indicate signs of depression. In depression, exaggerated all-or-nothing thinking can form a self-reinforcing cycle: these thoughts might be called emotional amplifiers because, as they go around and around, they become more intense. Typical all-or-nothing thoughts:

- My efforts are either a success or they are an abject failure.
- Other people are either all good or all bad.
- I am either all good or all bad.
- If you're not with us, you're against us.

=== Dissociative identity disorder ===
In dissociative identity disorder, a split refers to the creation of distinct personality alters. The development of alters in DID is related to extreme traumatization, in which an individual will "split" and create alter personalities as a response to adverse traumatic experiences.

Though the word splitting is used in the context of both dissociative Identity disorder and borderline personality disorder and there is comorbidity between the two, the definition of splitting is not the same.

== History ==
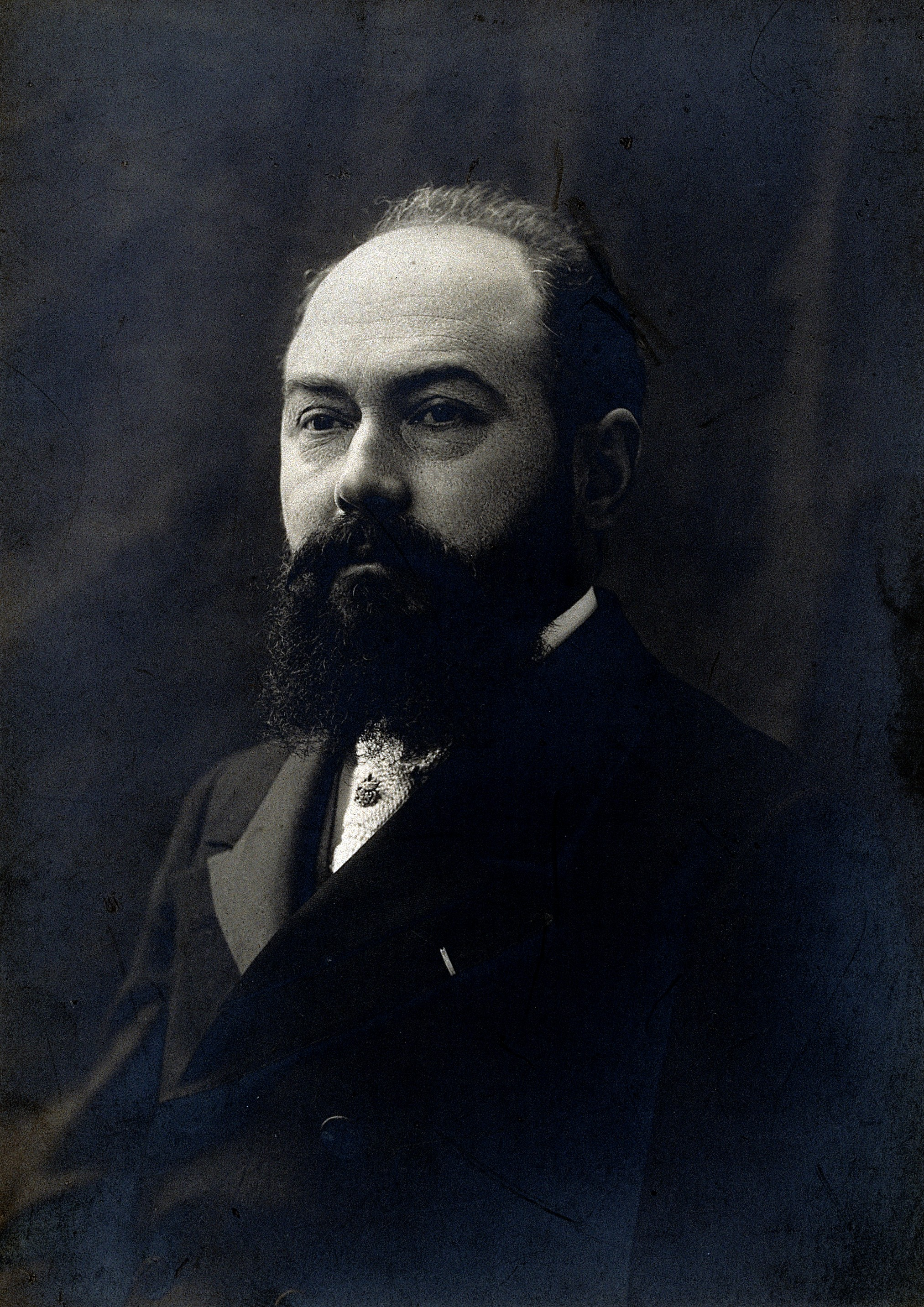
Pierre Janet

Splitting of consciousness ("normal self" vs. "secondary self") was first described by Pierre Janet in De l'automatisme psychologique (1889). His ideas were extended by Eugen Bleuler (who in 1908 coined the word schizophrenia from the Ancient Greek skhízō [σχίζω, "to split"] and phrḗn [φρήν, "mind"]) and Sigmund Freud to explain the splitting (German: Spaltung) of consciousness—not (with Janet) as the product of innate weakness, but as the result of inner conflict. With the development of the idea of repression, splitting moved to the background of Freud's thought for some years, being largely reserved for cases of double personality. However, his late work saw a renewed interest in how it was "possible for the ego to avoid a rupture... by effecting a cleavage or division of itself", a theme which was extended in his Outline of Psycho-Analysis (1940a [1938]) beyond fetishism to the neurotic in general.

His daughter Anna Freud explored how, in healthy childhood development, a splitting of loving and aggressive instincts could be avoided.

There was, however, from early on, another use of the term "splitting" in Freud that referred rather to resolving ambivalence "by splitting the contradictory feelings so that one person is only loved, another one only hated ... the good mother and the wicked stepmother in fairy tales". Or, with opposing feelings of love and hate, perhaps "the two opposites should have been split apart and one of them, usually the hatred, has been repressed". Such splitting was closely linked to the defence of "isolation ... The division of objects into congenial and uncongenial ones ... making 'disconnections'".

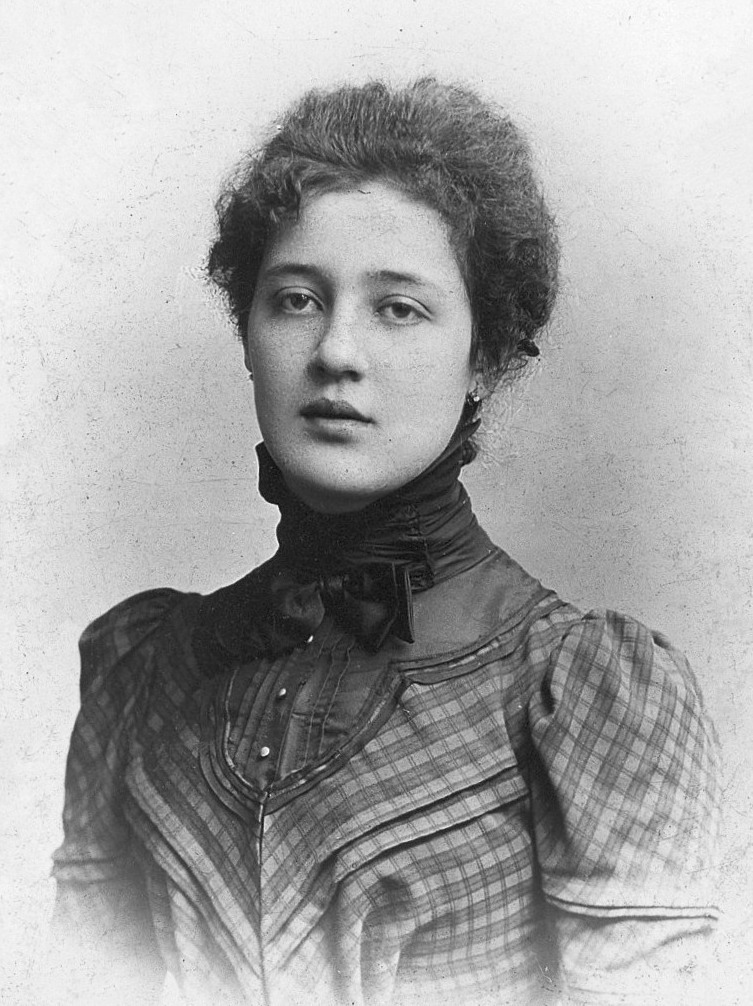
Melanie Klein

It was the latter sense of the term that was predominantly adopted and exploited by Melanie Klein. After Freud, "the most important contribution has come from Melanie Klein, whose work enlightens the idea of 'splitting of the object' (Objektspaltung) (in terms of 'good/bad' objects)". In her object relations theory, Klein argues that "the earliest experiences of the infant are split between wholly good ones with 'good' objects and wholly bad experiences with 'bad' objects", as children struggle to integrate the two primary drives, love and hate, into constructive social interaction. An important step in childhood development is the gradual depolarization of these two drives.

At what Klein called the paranoid-schizoid position, there is a stark separation of the things the child loves (good, gratifying objects) and the things the child hates (bad, frustrating objects), "because everything is polarised into extremes of love and hate, just like what the baby seems to experience and young children are still very close to". Klein refers to the good breast and the bad breast as split mental entities, resulting from the way "these primitive states tend to deconstruct objects into 'good' and 'bad' bits (called 'part-objects')". The child sees the breasts as opposite in nature at different times, although they actually are the same, belonging to the same mother. As the child learns that people and objects can be good and bad at the same time, he or she progresses to the next phase, the depressive position, which "entails a steady, though painful, approximation towards the reality of oneself and others": integrating the splits and "being able to balance [them] out ... are tasks that continue into early childhood and indeed are never completely finished".

However, Kleinians also use Freud's first conception of splitting to explain the way "in a related process of splitting, the person divides his own self. This is called 'splitting of the ego'". Indeed, Klein herself maintained that "the ego is incapable of splitting the object—internal or external—without a corresponding splitting taking place within the ego". Arguably at least, by this point "the idea of splitting does not carry the same meaning for Freud and for Klein": for the former, "the ego finds itself 'passively' split, as it were. For Klein and the post-Kleinians, on the other hand, splitting is an 'active' defence mechanism". As a result, by the close of the century "four kinds of splitting can be clearly identified, among many other possibilities" for post-Kleinians: "a coherent split in the object, a coherent split in the ego, a fragmentation of the object, and a fragmentation of the ego".

In the developmental model of Otto Kernberg, the overcoming of splitting is also an important developmental task. The child has to learn to integrate feelings of love and hate. Kernberg distinguishes three different stages in the development of a child with respect to splitting:

1. The child does not experience the self and the object, nor the good and the bad as different entities.
2. Good and bad are viewed as different. Because the boundaries between the self and the other are not stable yet, the other as a person is viewed as either all good or all bad, depending on their actions. This also means that thinking about another person as bad implies that the self is bad as well, so it's better to think about the caregiver as a good person, so the self is viewed as good too: "Bringing together extremely opposite loving and hateful images of the self and of significant others would trigger unbearable anxiety and guilt".
3. Splitting – "the division of external objects into 'all good' or 'all bad'" – begins to be resolved when the self and the other can be seen as possessing both good and bad qualities. Having hateful thoughts about the other does not mean that the self is all hateful and does not mean that the other person is all hateful either.

If a person fails to accomplish this developmental task satisfactorily, borderline pathology can emerge. In the borderline personality organization, Kernberg found "dissociated ego states that result from the use of 'splitting' defences". His therapeutic work then aimed at "the analysis of the repeated and oscillating projections of unwanted self and object representations onto the therapist" so as to produce "something more durable, complex and encompassing than the initial, split-off and polarized state of affairs".

== Horizontal and vertical ==
Heinz Kohut has emphasized in his self psychology the distinction between horizontal and vertical forms of splitting. Traditional psychoanalysis saw repression as forming a horizontal barrier between different levels of the mind – so that for example an unpleasant truth might be accepted superficially but denied in a deeper part of the psyche. Kohut contrasted this with vertical fractures of the mind into two parts with incompatible attitudes separated by mutual disavowal.

== Transference ==
It has been suggested that interpretation of the transference "becomes effective through a sort of splitting of the ego into a reasonable, judging portion and an experiencing portion, the former recognizing the latter as not appropriate in the present and as coming from the past". Clearly, "in this sense, splitting, so far from being a pathological phenomenon, is a manifestation of self-awareness". Nevertheless, "it remains to be investigated how this desirable 'splitting of the ego' and 'self-observation' are to be differentiated from the pathological cleavage ... directed at preserving isolations".

Transference is when someone who splits conveys feelings, attitudes, or defenses against someone currently in front of them, or who they are speaking to, who is not the actual object or target of those exact feelings. It is commonly expressed where a behavioral therapist purposefully draws out specific feelings or triggers to allow an individual to work through their emotions.

Because these individuals also have a split ego or consciousness, this can make them feel the emotions that are drawn out towards the person that is doing so even if that is not how they actually feel towards that person.

Transference is not the goal, however, because it can hinder the relationship built between client and therapist due to the permanent or temporary feelings that an individual may feel towards another. This hindrance usually occurs when the individual does not grasp the concept of what he or she is struggling with. Though, if they do understand, the process can be positive because the individual can begin practicing ways to cope with the emotions, defenses, or fantasies they have created and projected onto others. This all depends on the relationship built with the therapist due to these hindrances and whether or not they can be worked through.

The inability to grasp insight in transference is called negative transference. This is where an individual projects these fantasies, emotions, or defense on their therapist or another individual and cannot work them out due to an inability to gain insight or truly understand their own struggles. This can create a negative therapist/client relationship and cause treatment to be both ineffective and harmful to the client. However, positive transference can also occur where the individual projects these same emotions but, because they have gained insight into their mental struggles, can work through these projections leading to a productive, effective, and helpful treatment.

== See also ==
- Cognitive Dissonance
- Ambivalence
- Affirming a disjunct
- Black-and-white dualism
- Cognitive distortion
- Cognitive restructuring – Type of psychological therapy
- Compartmentalization
- Dehumanization
- Dialogical self
- Dissociative identity disorder
- Erik Erikson
- False dilemma
- Idealization and devaluation
- List of psychological effects
- Love–hate relationship
- Madonna–whore complex
- Paranoid anxiety
- Psychoanalytic concepts of love and hate
- Split subject (philosophy)
- Triangulation (psychology)
- You're either with us, or against us
