= List of mental disorders in the DSM-IV and DSM-IV-TR =

This is a list of mental disorders as defined in the DSM-IV, the fourth edition of the Diagnostic and Statistical Manual of Mental Disorders. Published by the American Psychiatry Association (APA), it was released in May 1994, superseding the DSM-III-R (1987). This list also includes updates featured in the text revision of the DSM-IV, the DSM-IV-TR, released in July 2000.

Similar to the DSM-III-R, the DSM-IV-TR was created to bridge the gap between the DSM-IV and the next major release, then named DSM-V (eventually titled DSM-5). The DSM-IV-TR contains expanded descriptions of disorders. Wordings were clarified and errors were corrected. The categorizations and the diagnostic criteria were largely unchanged. No new disorders or conditions were introduced, although a small number of subtypes were added and removed. ICD-9-CM codes that were changed since the release of IV were updated. The DSM-IV and the DSM-IV-TR both contain a total of 297 mental disorders.

For an alphabetical list, see List of mental disorders in the DSM-IV and DSM-IV-TR (alphabetical).

== Disorders usually first diagnosed in infancy, childhood, or adolescence ==
=== Mental retardation ===
- 317 Mild mental retardation
- 318.0 Moderate mental retardation
- 318.1 Severe mental retardation
- 318.2 Profound mental retardation
- 319 Mental retardation, severity unspecified

=== Learning disorders ===
- 315.00 Reading disorder
- 315.1 Mathematics disorder
- 315.2 Disorder of written expression
- 315.9 Learning disorder NOS

=== Motor skills disorders ===
- 315.4 Developmental coordination disorder

=== Communication disorders ===
- 315.31 Expressive language disorder
- 315.32 Mixed receptive-expressive language disorder (coded 315.31 in the DSM-IV)
- 315.39 Phonological disorder
- 307.0 Stuttering
- 307.9 Communication disorder NOS

=== Pervasive developmental disorders ===
- 299.00 Autistic disorder
- 299.80 Rett's disorder
- 299.10 Childhood disintegrative disorder
- 299.80 Asperger syndrome
- 299.80 PDD-NOS

=== Attention-deficit and disruptive behavior disorders ===
- 314.xx Attention-deficit/hyperactivity disorder
  - .01 Combined subtype
  - .01 Predominantly hyperactive-impulsive subtype
  - .00 Predominantly inattentive subtype
  - .9 Attention-deficit/hyperactivity disorder NOS
- 312.xx Conduct disorder (coded 312.8 in the DSM-IV)
  - .81 Childhood-onset type (code included only in the DSM-IV-TR)
  - .82 Adolescent-onset type (code included only in the DSM-IV-TR)
  - .89 Unspecified onset (code included only in the DSM-IV-TR)
- 313.81 Oppositional defiant disorder
- 312.9 Disruptive Behavior Disorder NOS

=== Feeding and eating disorders of infancy or early childhood ===
- 307.52 Pica
- 307.53 Rumination disorder
- 307.59 Feeding disorder of infancy or early childhood

=== Tic disorders ===
- 307.23 Tourette's disorder
- 307.22 Chronic motor or vocal tic disorder
- 307.21 Transient tic disorder
- 307.20 Tic disorder NOS

=== Elimination disorders ===
- 307.6 Enuresis (not due to a general medical condition)
- 307.7 Encopresis, without constipation and overflow incontinence
- 787.6 Encopresis, with constipation and overflow incontinence

=== Other disorders of infancy, childhood, or adolescence ===
- 309.21 Separation anxiety disorder
- 313.23 Selective mutism
- 313.89 Reactive attachment disorder of infancy or early childhood
- 307.3 Stereotypic movement disorder
- 313.9 Disorder of infancy, childhood, or adolescence NOS

== Delirium, dementia, and amnestic and other cognitive disorders ==
=== Delirium ===
- 293.0 Delirium due to... [indicate the general medical condition]
- 780.09 Delirium NOS

=== Dementia ===
- 294.xx Dementia of the Alzheimer's type, with early onset (coded 290.xx in the DSM-IV)
  - .10 Without behavioral disturbance (DSM-IV-TR only)
  - .11 With behavioral disturbance (DSM-IV-TR only)
  - .10 Uncomplicated (DSM-IV only)
  - .11 With delirium (DSM-IV only)
  - .12 With delusions (DSM-IV only)
  - .13 With depressed mood (DSM-IV only)
- 294.xx Dementia of the Alzheimer's type, with late onset (coded 290.xx in the DSM-IV)
  - .10 Without behavioral disturbance (DSM-IV-TR only)
  - .11 With behavioral disturbance (DSM-IV-TR only)
  - .0 Uncomplicated (DSM-IV only)
  - .3 With delirium (DSM-IV only)
  - .20 With delusions (DSM-IV only)
  - .21 With depressed mood (DSM-IV only)
- 290.xx Vascular dementia
  - .40 Uncomplicated
  - .41 With delirium
  - .42 With delusions
  - .43 With depressed mood
- 294.1x Dementia due to HIV disease (coded 294.9 in the DSM-IV)
- 294.1x Dementia due to head trauma (coded 294.1 in the DSM-IV)
- 294.1x Dementia due to Parkinson's disease (coded 294.9 in the DSM-IV)
- 294.1x Dementia due to Huntington's disease (coded 294.1 in the DSM-IV)
- 294.1x Dementia due to Pick's disease (coded 290.10 in the DSM-IV)
- 294.1x Dementia due to Creutzfeldt–Jakob disease (coded 290.10 in the DSM-IV)
- 294.1x Dementia due to ... [Indicate the general medical condition not listed above] (coded 294.1 in the DSM-IV)
- 294.8 Dementia NOS

=== Amnestic disorders ===
- 294.0 Amnestic disorder due to... [indicate the general medical condition]
- 294.8 Amnestic disorder NOS

=== Other cognitive disorders ===
- 294.9 Cognitive disorder NOS

== Mental disorders due to a general medical condition not elsewhere classified ==
- 293.89 Catatonic disorder due to... [indicate the general medical condition]
- 310.1 Personality change due to... [indicate the general medical condition]
  - (Subtypes: Labile, Disinhibited, Aggressive, Apathetic, Paranoid, Other, Combined, Unspecified)
- 293.9 Mental disorder NOS due to... [indicate the general medical condition]

== Substance-related disorders ==
=== Alcohol-related disorders ===
==== Alcohol use disorders ====
- 303.90 Alcohol dependence
- 305.00 Alcohol abuse

==== Alcohol-induced disorders ====
- 303.00 Alcohol intoxication
- 291.81 Alcohol withdrawal (coded 291.8 in the DSM-IV)
- 291.0 Alcohol intoxication delirium
- 291.0 Alcohol withdrawal delirium
- 291.2 Alcohol-induced persisting dementia
- 291.1 Alcohol-induced persisting amnestic disorder
- 291.x Alcohol-induced psychotic disorder
  - .5 With delusions
  - .3 With hallucinations
- 291.89 Alcohol-induced mood disorder (coded 291.8 in the DSM-IV)
- 291.89 Alcohol-induced anxiety disorder (coded 291.8 in the DSM-IV)
- 291.89 Alcohol-induced sexual dysfunction (coded 291.8 in the DSM-IV)
- 291.89 Alcohol-induced sleep disorder (coded 291.8 in the DSM-IV)
- 291.9 Alcohol-related disorder NOS

=== Amphetamine (or amphetamine-like)-related disorders ===
==== Amphetamine use disorders ====
- 304.40 Amphetamine dependence
- 305.70 Amphetamine abuse

==== Amphetamine-induced disorders ====
- 292.89 Amphetamine intoxication
- 292.0 Amphetamine withdrawal
- 292.81 Amphetamine intoxication delirium
- 292.xx Amphetamine-induced psychotic disorder
  - .11 With delusions
  - .12 With hallucinations
- 292.84 Amphetamine-induced mood disorder
- 292.89 Amphetamine-induced anxiety disorder
- 292.89 Amphetamine-induced sexual dysfunction
- 292.89 Amphetamine-induced sleep disorder
- 292.9 Amphetamine-related disorder NOS

=== Caffeine-related disorders ===
==== Caffeine-induced disorders ====
- 305.90 Caffeine intoxication
- 292.89 Caffeine-induced anxiety disorder
- 292.89 Caffeine-induced sleep disorder
- 292.9 Caffeine-related disorder NOS

=== Cannabis-related disorders ===
==== Cannabis use disorders ====
- 304.30 Cannabis dependence
- 305.20 Cannabis abuse

==== Cannabis-induced disorders ====
- 292.89 Cannabis intoxication
- 292.81 Cannabis intoxication delirium
- 292.xx Cannabis-induced psychotic disorder
  - .11 With delusions
  - .12 With hallucinations
- 292.89 Cannabis-induced anxiety disorder
- 292.9 Cannabis-related disorder NOS

=== Cocaine-related disorders ===
==== Cocaine use disorders ====
- 304.20 Cocaine dependence
- 305.60 Cocaine abuse

==== Cocaine-induced disorders ====
- 292.89 Cocaine intoxication
- 292.0 Cocaine withdrawal
- 292.81 Cocaine intoxication delirium
- 292.xx Cocaine-induced psychotic disorder
  - .11 With delusions
  - .12 With hallucinations
- 292.84 Cocaine-induced mood disorder
- 292.89 Cocaine-induced anxiety disorder
- 292.89 Cocaine-induced sexual dysfunction
- 292.89 Cocaine-induced sleep disorder
- 292.9 Cocaine-related disorder NOS

=== Hallucinogen-related disorders ===
==== Hallucinogen use disorders ====
- 304.50 Hallucinogen dependence
- 305.30 Hallucinogen abuse

==== Hallucinogen-induced disorders ====
- 292.89 Hallucinogen intoxication
- 292.89 Hallucinogen persisting perception disorder (Flashbacks)
- 292.81 Hallucinogen intoxication delirium
- 292.xx Hallucinogen-induced psychotic disorder
  - .11 With delusions
  - .12 With hallucinations
- 292.84 Hallucinogen-induced mood disorder
- 292.89 Hallucinogen-induced anxiety disorder
- 292.9 Hallucinogen-related disorder NOS

=== Inhalant-related disorders ===
==== Inhalant use disorders ====
- 304.60 Inhalant dependence
- 305.90 Inhalant abuse

==== Inhalant-induced disorders ====
- 292.89 Inhalant intoxication
- 292.81 Inhalant intoxication delirium
- 292.82 Inhalant-induced persisting dementia
- 292.xx Inhalant-induced psychotic disorder
  - .11 With delusions
  - .12 With hallucinations
- 292.84 Inhalant-induced mood disorder
- 292.89 Inhalant-induced anxiety disorder
- 292.9 Inhalant-related disorder NOS

=== Nicotine-related disorders ===
==== Nicotine use disorder ====
- 305.1 Nicotine dependence (coded 305.10 in the DSM-IV)

==== Nicotine-induced disorder ====
- 292.0 Nicotine withdrawal
- 292.9 Nicotine-related disorder NOS

=== Opioid-related disorders ===
==== Opioid use disorders ====
- 304.00 Opioid dependence
- 305.50 Opioid abuse

==== Opioid-induced disorders ====
- 292.89 Opioid intoxication
- 292.0 Opioid withdrawal
- 292.81 Opioid intoxication delirium
- 292.xx Opioid-induced psychotic disorder
  - .11 With delusions
  - .12 With hallucinations
- 292.84 Opioid-induced mood disorder
- 292.89 Opioid-induced sexual dysfunction
- 292.89 Opioid-induced sleep disorder
- 292.9 Opioid-related disorder NOS

=== Phencyclidine (or phencyclidine-like) related disorders ===
==== Phencyclidine use disorders ====
- 304.60 Phencyclidine dependence (coded 304.90 in the DSM-IV)
- 305.90 Phencyclidine abuse

==== Phencyclidine-induced disorders ====
- 292.89 Phencyclidine intoxication
- 292.81 Phencyclidine intoxication delirium
- 292.xx Phencyclidine-induced psychotic disorder
  - .11 With delusions
  - .12 With hallucinations
- 292.84 Phencyclidine-induced mood disorder
- 292.89 Phencyclidine-induced anxiety disorder
- 292.9 Phencyclidine-related disorder NOS

=== Sedative-, hypnotic-, or anxiolytic-related disorders ===
==== Sedative, hypnotic, or anxiolytic use disorders ====
- 304.10 Sedative, hypnotic, or anxiolytic dependence
- 305.40 Sedative, hypnotic, or anxiolytic abuse

==== Sedative-, hypnotic-, or anxiolytic-induced disorders ====
- 292.89 Sedative, hypnotic, or anxiolytic intoxication
- 292.0 Sedative, hypnotic, or anxiolytic withdrawal
- 292.81 Sedative, hypnotic, or anxiolytic intoxication delirium
- 292.81 Sedative, hypnotic, or anxiolytic withdrawal delirium
- 292.82 Sedative-, hypnotic-, or anxiolytic-induced persisting dementia
- 292.83 Sedative-, hypnotic-, or anxiolytic-induced persisting amnestic disorder
- 292.xx Sedative-, hypnotic-, or anxiolytic-induced psychotic disorder
  - .11 With delusions
  - .12 With hallucinations
- 292.84 Sedative-, hypnotic-, or anxiolytic-induced mood disorder
- 292.89 Sedative-, hypnotic-, or anxiolytic-induced anxiety disorder
- 292.89 Sedative-, hypnotic-, or anxiolytic-induced sexual dysfunction
- 292.89 Sedative-, hypnotic-, or anxiolytic-induced sleep disorder
- 292.9 Sedative-, hypnotic-, or anxiolytic-related disorder NOS

=== Polysubstance-related disorder ===
- 304.80 Polysubstance dependence

=== Other (or unknown) substance-related disorders ===
==== Other (or unknown) substance use disorders ====
- 304.90 Other (or unknown) substance dependence
- 305.90 Other (or unknown) substance abuse

==== Other (or unknown) substance-induced disorders ====
- 292.89 Other (or unknown) substance intoxication
- 292.0 Other (or unknown) substance withdrawal
- 292.81 Other (or unknown) substance-induced delirium
- 292.82 Other (or unknown) substance-induced persisting dementia
- 292.83 Other (or unknown) substance-induced persisting amnestic disorder
- 292.xx Other (or unknown) substance-induced psychotic disorder
  - .11 With delusions
  - .12 With hallucinations
- 292.84 Other (or unknown) substance-induced mood disorder
- 292.89 Other (or unknown) substance-induced anxiety disorder
- 292.89 Other (or unknown) substance-induced sexual dysfunction
- 292.89 Other (or unknown) substance-induced sleep disorder
- 292.9 Other (or unknown) substance-related disorder NOS

== Schizophrenia and other psychotic disorders ==
- 295.xx Schizophrenia
  - 295.20 Catatonic type
  - 295.10 Disorganized type
  - 295.30 Paranoid type
  - 295.60 Residual type
  - 295.90 Undifferentiated type
- 295.40 Schizophreniform disorder
- 295.70 Schizoaffective disorder
- 297.1 Delusional disorder
  - Erotomanic subtype
  - Grandiose subtype
  - Jealous subtype
  - Persecutory subtype
  - Somatic subtype
  - Mixed type
- 298.8 Brief psychotic disorder
- 297.3 Shared psychotic disorder
- Psychotic disorder due to ... [indicate the general medical condition]
  - 293.81 With delusions
  - 293.82 With hallucinations
- 298.9 Psychotic disorder NOS

== Mood disorders ==
- 293.83 Mood disorder due to ... [indicate the general medical condition]
- 296.90 Mood disorder NOS

=== Depressive disorders ===
- 296.xx Major depressive disorder
  - .2x Major depressive disorder, single episode
    - .26 In full remission
    - .25 In partial remission
    - .21 Mild
    - .22 Moderate
    - .23 Severe without psychotic features
    - .24 Severe with psychotic features
    - .20 Unspecified
  - .3x Major depressive disorder, recurrent
    - .36 In full remission
    - .35 In partial remission
    - .31 Mild
    - .32 Moderate
    - .33 Severe without psychotic features
    - .34 Severe with psychotic features
    - .30 Unspecified
- 300.4 Dysthymic disorder
- 311 Depressive disorder NOS

=== Bipolar disorders ===
- 296.xx Bipolar I disorder
  - .5x Bipolar I disorder, most recent episode depressed
    - .56 In full remission
    - .55 In partial remission
    - .51 Mild
    - .52 Moderate
    - .53 Severe without psychotic features
    - .54 Severe with psychotic features
    - .50 Unspecified
  - .40 Bipolar I disorder, most recent episode hypomanic
  - .4x Bipolar I disorder, most recent episode manic
    - .46 In full remission
    - .45 In partial remission
    - .41 Mild
    - .42 Moderate
    - .43 Severe without psychotic features
    - .44 Severe with psychotic features
    - .40 Unspecified
  - .6x Bipolar I disorder, most recent episode mixed
    - .66 In full remission
    - .65 In partial remission
    - .61 Mild
    - .62 Moderate
    - .63 Severe without psychotic features
    - .64 Severe with psychotic features
    - .60 Unspecified
  - .7 Bipolar I disorder, most recent episode unspecified
  - .0x Bipolar I disorder, single manic episode
    - .06 In full remission
    - .05 In partial remission
    - .01 Mild
    - .02 Moderate
    - .03 Severe without psychotic features
    - .04 Severe with psychotic features
    - .00 Unspecified
  - 296.89 Bipolar II disorder
- 301.13 Cyclothymic disorder
- 296.80 Bipolar disorder NOS

== Anxiety disorders ==
- 300.01 Panic disorder without agoraphobia
- 300.21 Panic disorder with agoraphobia
- 300.22 Agoraphobia without history of panic disorder
- 300.29 Specific phobia
- 300.23 Social phobia
- 300.3 Obsessive–compulsive disorder
- 309.81 Posttraumatic stress disorder
- 308.3 Acute stress disorder
- 300.02 Generalized anxiety disorder
- 293.84 Anxiety disorder due to ... [indicate the general medical condition] (coded 293.89 in the DSM-IV)
- 300.00 Anxiety disorder NOS

== Somatoform disorders ==
- 300.81 Somatization disorder
- 300.82 Undifferentiated somatoform disorder (coded 300.81 in the DSM-IV)
- 300.11 Conversion disorder
- 307.xx Pain disorder
  - 307.80 Associated with psychological factors
  - 307.89 Associated with both psychological factors and a general medical condition
- 300.7 Hypochondriasis
- 300.7 Body dysmorphic disorder
- 300.82 Somatoform disorder NOS (coded 300.81 in the DSM-IV)

== Factitious disorders ==
- 300.xx Factitious disorder
  - .19 With combined psychological and physical signs and symptoms
  - .19 With predominantly physical signs and symptoms
  - .16 With predominantly psychological signs and symptoms
- 300.19 Factitious disorder NOS

== Dissociative disorders ==
- 300.12 Dissociative amnesia
- 300.13 Dissociative fugue
- 300.14 Dissociative identity disorder
- 300.6 Depersonalization disorder
- 300.15 Dissociative disorder NOS

== Sexual and gender identity disorders ==
=== Sexual dysfunctions ===
==== Sexual desire disorders ====
- 302.71 Hypoactive sexual desire disorder
- 302.79 Sexual aversion disorder

==== Sexual arousal disorders ====
- 302.72 Female sexual arousal disorder
- 302.72 Male erectile disorder

==== Orgasmic disorders ====
- 302.73 Female orgasmic disorder
- 302.74 Male orgasmic disorder
- 302.75 Premature ejaculation

==== Sexual pain disorders ====
- 302.76 Dyspareunia (not due to a general medical condition)
- 306.51 Vaginismus (not due to a general medical condition)

==== Sexual dysfunction due to a general medical condition ====
- 625.8 Female hypoactive sexual desire disorder due to ... [indicate the general medical condition]
- 608.89 Male hypoactive sexual desire disorder due to ... [indicate the general medical condition]
- 607.84 Male erectile disorder due to ... [indicate the general medical condition]
- 625.0 Female dyspareunia due to ... [indicate the general medical condition]
- 608.89 Male dyspareunia due to ... [indicate the general medical condition]
- 625.8 Other female sexual dysfunction due to ... [indicate the general medical condition]
- 608.89 Other male sexual dysfunction due to ... [indicate the general medical condition]
- 302.70 Sexual dysfunction NOS

=== Paraphilias ===
- 302.4 Exhibitionism
- 302.81 Fetishism
- 302.89 Frotteurism
- 302.2 Pedophilia
- 302.83 Sexual masochism
- 302.84 Sexual sadism
- 302.3 Transvestic fetishism
- 302.82 Voyeurism
- 302.9 Paraphilia NOS

=== Gender identity disorders ===
- 302.xx Gender identity disorder
  - .6 in children
  - .85 in adolescents or adults
- 302.6 Gender identity disorder NOS
- 302.9 Sexual disorder NOS

== Eating disorders ==
- 307.1 Anorexia nervosa
- 307.51 Bulimia nervosa
- 307.50 Eating disorder NOS

== Sleep disorders ==
=== Primary sleep disorders ===
==== Dyssomnias ====
- 307.44 Primary hypersomnia
- 307.42 Primary insomnia
- 347 Narcolepsy
- 780.59 Breathing-related sleep disorder
- 307.45 Circadian rhythm sleep disorder
- 307.47 Dyssomnia NOS

=== Parasomnias ===
- 307.47 Nightmare disorder
- 307.46 Sleep terror disorder
- 307.46 Sleepwalking disorder
- 307.47 Parasomnia NOS

=== Sleep disorders related to another mental disorder ===
- 307.42 Insomnia Related to ... [indicate the Axis I or Axis II disorder]
- 307.44 Hypersomnia Related to ... [indicate the Axis I or Axis II disorder]

=== Other sleep disorders ===
- 780.xx Sleep disorder due to... [indicate the general medical condition]
  - .54 Hypersomnia type
  - .52 Insomnia type
  - .59 Mixed type
  - .59 Parasomnia type

== Impulse-control disorders not elsewhere classified ==
- 312.34 Intermittent explosive disorder
- 312.32 Kleptomania
- 312.31 Pathological gambling
- 312.33 Pyromania
- 312.39 Trichotillomania
- 312.30 Impulse-control disorder NOS

== Adjustment disorders ==
- 309.xx Adjustment disorders
  - .9 Unspecified
  - .24 With anxiety
  - .0 With depressed mood
  - .3 With disturbance of conduct
  - .28 With mixed anxiety and depressed mood
  - .4 With mixed disturbance of emotions and conduct

== Personality disorders (Axis II) ==
Cluster A (odd or eccentric):

- 301.0 Paranoid personality disorder
- 301.20 Schizoid personality disorder
- 301.22 Schizotypal personality disorder

Cluster B (dramatic, emotional, or erratic):

- 301.7 Antisocial personality disorder
- 301.83 Borderline personality disorder
- 301.50 Histrionic personality disorder
- 301.81 Narcissistic personality disorder

Cluster C (anxious or fearful):

- 301.82 Avoidant personality disorder
- 301.6 Dependent personality disorder
- 301.4 Obsessive–compulsive personality disorder

NOS:

- 301.9 Personality disorder not otherwise specified

== Other conditions that may be a focus of clinical attention ==
=== Psychological factors affecting medical condition ===
- 316 ... [Specified psychological factor] affecting ... [indicate the general medical condition]

=== Medication-induced movement disorders ===
- 332.1 Neuroleptic-induced Parkinsonism
- 333.92 Neuroleptic malignant syndrome
- 333.7 Neuroleptic-induced acute dystonia
- 333.99 Neuroleptic-induced acute akathisia
- 333.82 Neuroleptic-induced tardive dyskinesia
- 333.1 Medication-induced postural tremor
- 333.90 Medication-induced movement disorder NOS

=== Other medication-induced disorder ===
- 995.2 Adverse effects of medication NOS

=== Relational problems ===
- V61.9 Relational problem related to a mental disorder or general medical condition
- V61.20 Parent-child relational problem
- V61.10 Partner relational problem (coded V61.1 in the DSM-IV)
- V61.8 Sibling relational problem
- V62.81 Relational problem NOS

=== Problems related to abuse or neglect ===
- V61.21 Physical abuse of Child
- V61.21 Sexual abuse of child
- V61.21 Neglect of child
- ___.__ Physical abuse of adult (coded V61.1 in the DSM-IV)
  - V61.12 if by partner (included only in the DSM-IV-TR)
  - V62.83 if by person other than partner (included only in the DSM-IV-TR)
- ___.__ Sexual abuse of adult (coded V61.1 in the DSM-IV)
  - V61.12 if by partner (included only in the DSM-IV-TR)
  - V62.83 if by person other than partner (included only in the DSM-IV-TR)

=== Additional conditions that may be a focus of clinical attention ===
- V15.81 Noncompliance with treatment
- V65.2 Malingering
- V71.01 Adult antisocial behavior
- V71.02 Child or adolescent antisocial behavior
- V62.89 Borderline intellectual functioning
- 780.9 Age-related cognitive decline
- V62.82 Bereavement
- V62.3 Academic problem
- V62.2 Occupational problem
- 313.82 Identity problem
- V62.89 Religious or spiritual problem
- V62.4 Acculturation problem
- V62.89 Phase of life problem

== Additional codes ==
- 300.9 Unspecified mental disorder (nonpsychotic)
- V71.09 No diagnosis or condition on Axis I
- 799.9 Diagnosis or condition deferred on Axis I
- V71.09 No diagnosis on Axis II
- 799.9 Diagnosis deferred on Axis II

== See also ==
- Classification of mental disorders
- Clinical coder
- DSM-5#Changes from DSM-IV
- List of ICD-9 codes 290–319: mental disorders
- List of mental disorders in the DSM-III and DSM-III-R
- List of mental disorders in the DSM-5 and DSM-5-TR
