= List of mental disorders in the DSM-IV and DSM-IV-TR (alphabetical) =

This is an alphabetically sorted list of all mental disorders in the DSM-IV and DSM-IV-TR, along with their ICD-9-CM codes, where applicable.

The DSM-IV-TR is a text revision of the DSM-IV. While no new disorders were added in this version, 11 subtypes were added and 8 were removed. This list features both the added and removed subtypes. Also, 22 ICD-9-CM codes were updated. The ICD codes stated in the first column are those from the DSM-IV-TR. The ones that were updated are marked yellow – the older ICD codes from the DSM-IV are stated in the third column.

== List ==
Code	Name	Notes
V62.3	Academic problem	
V62.4	Acculturation problem	
308.3	Acute stress disorder	
309.xx	Adjustment disorder	
309.9	Adjustment disorder, unspecified	
309.24	Adjustment disorder, with anxiety	
309.0	Adjustment disorder, with depressed mood	
309.3	Adjustment disorder, with disturbance of conduct	
309.28	Adjustment disorder, with mixed anxiety and depressed mood	
309.4	Adjustment disorder, with mixed disturbance of emotions and conduct	
V71.01	Adult antisocial behavior	
995.2	Adverse effects of medication NOS	
780.9	Age-related cognitive decline	
300.22	Agoraphobia without history of panic disorder	
305.00	Alcohol abuse	
303.90	Alcohol dependence	
303.00	Alcohol intoxication	
291.0	Alcohol intoxication delirium	
291.81	Alcohol withdrawal	Coded 291.8 in the DSM-IV.
291.0	Alcohol withdrawal delirium	
291.89	Alcohol-induced anxiety disorder	Coded 291.8 in the DSM-IV.
291.89	Alcohol-induced mood disorder	Coded 291.8 in the DSM-IV.
291.1	Alcohol-induced persisting amnestic disorder	
291.2	Alcohol-induced persisting dementia	
291.x	Alcohol-induced psychotic disorder	
291.5	Alcohol-induced psychotic disorder, with delusions	
291.3	Alcohol-induced psychotic disorder, with hallucinations	
291.89	Alcohol-induced sexual dysfunction	Coded 291.8 in the DSM-IV.
291.89	Alcohol-induced sleep disorder	Coded 291.8 in the DSM-IV.
291.9	Alcohol-related disorder NOS	
294.0	Amnestic disorder due to ... [indicate the general medical condition]	
294.8	Amnestic disorder NOS	
305.70	Amphetamine abuse	
304.40	Amphetamine dependence	
292.89	Amphetamine intoxication	
292.81	Amphetamine intoxication delirium	
292.0	Amphetamine withdrawal	
292.89	Amphetamine-induced anxiety disorder	
292.84	Amphetamine-induced mood disorder	
292.xx	Amphetamine-induced psychotic disorder	
292.11	Amphetamine-induced psychotic disorder, with delusions	
292.12	Amphetamine-induced psychotic disorder, with hallucinations	
292.89	Amphetamine-induced sexual dysfunction	
292.89	Amphetamine-induced sleep disorder	
292.9	Amphetamine-related disorder NOS	
307.1	Anorexia nervosa	
301.7	Antisocial personality disorder	
293.84	Anxiety disorder due to ... [indicate the general medical condition]	Coded 293.89 in the DSM-IV.
300.00	Anxiety disorder NOS	
299.80	Asperger's disorder	
314.xx	Attention-deficit/hyperactivity disorder	
314.9	Attention-deficit/hyperactivity disorder NOS	
314.01	Attention-deficit/hyperactivity disorder, combined type	
314.01	Attention-deficit/hyperactivity disorder, predominantly hyperactive-impulsive type	
314.00	Attention-deficit/hyperactivity disorder, predominantly inattentive type	
299.00	Autistic disorder	
301.82	Avoidant personality disorder	
V62.82	Bereavement	
296.80	Bipolar disorder NOS	
296.xx	Bipolar I disorder	
296.5x	Bipolar I disorder, most recent episode depressed	
296.56	Bipolar I disorder, most recent episode depressed, in full remission	
296.55	Bipolar I disorder, most recent episode depressed, in partial remission	
296.51	Bipolar I disorder, most recent episode depressed, mild	
296.52	Bipolar I disorder, most recent episode depressed, moderate	
296.54	Bipolar I disorder, most recent episode depressed, severe with psychotic features	
296.53	Bipolar I disorder, most recent episode depressed, severe without psychotic features	
296.50	Bipolar I disorder, most recent episode depressed, unspecified	
296.40	Bipolar I disorder, most recent episode hypomanic	
296.4x	Bipolar I disorder, most recent episode manic	
296.46	Bipolar I disorder, most recent episode manic, in full remission	
296.45	Bipolar I disorder, most recent episode manic, in partial remission	
296.41	Bipolar I disorder, most recent episode manic, mild	
296.42	Bipolar I disorder, most recent episode manic, moderate	
296.44	Bipolar I disorder, most recent episode manic, severe with psychotic features	
296.43	Bipolar I disorder, most recent episode manic, severe without psychotic features	
296.40	Bipolar I disorder, most recent episode manic, unspecified	
296.6x	Bipolar I disorder, most recent episode mixed	
296.66	Bipolar I disorder, most recent episode mixed, in full remission	
296.65	Bipolar I disorder, most recent episode mixed, in partial remission	
296.61	Bipolar I disorder, most recent episode mixed, mild	
296.62	Bipolar I disorder, most recent episode mixed, moderate	
296.64	Bipolar I disorder, most recent episode mixed, severe with psychotic features	
296.63	Bipolar I disorder, most recent episode mixed, severe without psychotic features	
296.60	Bipolar I disorder, most recent episode mixed, unspecified	
296.7	Bipolar I disorder, most recent episode unspecified	
296.0x	Bipolar I disorder, single manic episode	
296.06	Bipolar I disorder, single manic episode, in full remission	
296.05	Bipolar I disorder, single manic episode, in partial remission	
296.01	Bipolar I disorder, single manic episode, mild	
296.02	Bipolar I disorder, single manic episode, moderate	
296.04	Bipolar I disorder, single manic episode, severe with psychotic features	
296.03	Bipolar I disorder, single manic episode, severe without psychotic features	
296.00	Bipolar I disorder, single manic episode, unspecified	
296.89	Bipolar II disorder	
300.7	Body dysmorphic disorder	
V62.89	Borderline intellectual functioning	
301.83	Borderline personality disorder	
780.59	Breathing-related sleep disorder	
298.8	Brief psychotic disorder	
307.51	Bulimia nervosa	
305.90	Caffeine intoxication	
292.89	Caffeine-induced anxiety disorder	
292.89	Caffeine-induced sleep disorder	
292.9	Caffeine-related disorder NOS	
305.20	Cannabis abuse	
304.30	Cannabis dependence	
292.89	Cannabis intoxication	
292.81	Cannabis intoxication delirium	
292.89	Cannabis-induced anxiety disorder	
292.xx	Cannabis-induced psychotic disorder	
292.11	Cannabis-induced psychotic disorder, with delusions	
292.12	Cannabis-induced psychotic disorder, with hallucinations	
292.9	Cannabis-related disorder NOS	
293.89	Catatonic disorder due to ... [indicate the general medical condition]	
V71.02	Child or adolescent antisocial behavior	
299.10	Childhood disintegrative disorder	
307.22	Chronic motor or vocal tic disorder	
307.45	Circadian rhythm sleep disorder	
305.60	Cocaine abuse	
304.20	Cocaine dependence	
292.89	Cocaine intoxication	
292.81	Cocaine intoxication delirium	
292.0	Cocaine withdrawal	
292.89	Cocaine-induced anxiety disorder	
292.84	Cocaine-induced mood disorder	
292.xx	Cocaine-induced psychotic disorder	
292.11	Cocaine-induced psychotic disorder, with delusions	
292.12	Cocaine-induced psychotic disorder, with hallucinations	
292.89	Cocaine-induced sexual dysfunction	
292.89	Cocaine-induced sleep disorder	
292.9	Cocaine-related disorder NOS	
294.9	Cognitive disorder NOS	
307.9	Communication disorder NOS	
312.xx	Conduct disorder	Coded 312.8 in the DSM-IV.
312.82	Conduct disorder, adolescent-onset type	Code included only in the DSM-IV-TR.
312.81	Conduct disorder, childhood-onset type	Code included only in the DSM-IV-TR.
312.89	Conduct disorder, unspecified onset	Code included only in the DSM-IV-TR.
300.11	Conversion disorder	
301.13	Cyclothymic disorder	
293.0	Delirium due to ... [indicate the general medical condition]	
___._	Delirium due to multiple etiologies	
780.09	Delirium NOS	
297.1	Delusional disorder	
294.1x	Dementia due to ... [indicate the general medical condition not listed above]	Coded 294.1 in the DSM-IV.
294.1x	Dementia due to Creutzfeldt-Jakob disease	Coded 290.10 in the DSM-IV.
294.1x	Dementia due to head trauma	Coded 294.1 in the DSM-IV.
294.1x	Dementia due to HIV disease	Coded 294.9 in the DSM-IV.
294.1x	Dementia due to Huntington's disease	Coded 294.1 in the DSM-IV.
___._	Dementia due to multiple etiologies	
294.1x	Dementia due to Parkinson's disease	Coded 294.9 in the DSM-IV.
294.1x	Dementia due to Pick's disease	Coded 290.10 in the DSM-IV.
294.8	Dementia NOS	
294.xx	Dementia of the Alzheimer's type, with early onset	Coded 290.xx in the DSM-IV.
290.10	Dementia of the Alzheimer's type, with early onset, uncomplicated	Included only in the DSM-IV.
294.11	Dementia of the Alzheimer's type, with early onset, with behavioral disturbance	Included only in the DSM-IV-TR.
290.11	Dementia of the Alzheimer's type, with early onset, with delirium	Included only in the DSM-IV.
290.12	Dementia of the Alzheimer's type, with early onset, with delusions	Included only in the DSM-IV.
290.13	Dementia of the Alzheimer's type, with early onset, with depressed mood	Included only in the DSM-IV.
294.10	Dementia of the Alzheimer's type, with early onset, without behavioral disturbance	Included only in the DSM-IV-TR.
294.xx	Dementia of the Alzheimer's type, with late onset	Coded 290.xx in the DSM-IV.
290.0	Dementia of the Alzheimer's type, with late onset, uncomplicated	Included only in the DSM-IV.
294.11	Dementia of the Alzheimer's type, with late onset, with behavioral disturbance	Included only in the DSM-IV-TR.
290.3	Dementia of the Alzheimer's type, with late onset, with delirium	Included only in the DSM-IV.
290.20	Dementia of the Alzheimer's type, with late onset, with delusions	Included only in the DSM-IV.
290.21	Dementia of the Alzheimer's Type, With late onset, with depressed mood	Included only in the DSM-IV.
294.10	Dementia of the Alzheimer's Type, with late onset, without behavioral disturbance	Included only in the DSM-IV-TR.
301.6	Dependent personality disorder	
300.6	Depersonalization disorder	
311	Depressive disorder NOS	
315.4	Developmental coordination disorder	
799.9	Diagnosis deferred on Axis II	
799.9	Diagnosis or condition deferred on Axis I	
313.9	Disorder of infancy, childhood, or adolescence NOS	
315.2	Disorder of written expression	
312.9	Disruptive behavior disorder NOS	
300.12	Dissociative amnesia	
300.15	Dissociative disorder NOS	
300.13	Dissociative fugue	
300.14	Dissociative identity disorder	
302.76	Dyspareunia (not due to a general medical condition)	
307.47	Dyssomnia NOS	
300.4	Dysthymic disorder	
307.50	Eating disorder NOS	
___._	Encopresis	
787.6	Encopresis, with constipation and overflow incontinence	
307.7	Encopresis, without constipation and overflow incontinence	
307.6	Enuresis (Not due to a general medical condition)	
302.4	Exhibitionism	
315.31	Expressive language disorder	
300.xx	Factitious disorder	
300.19	Factitious disorder NOS	
300.19	Factitious disorder, with combined psychological and physical signs and symptoms	
300.19	Factitious disorder, with predominantly physical signs and symptoms	
300.16	Factitious disorder, with predominantly psychological signs and symptoms	
307.59	Feeding disorder of infancy or early childhood	
625.0	Female dyspareunia due to ... [indicate the general medical condition]	
625.8	Female hypoactive sexual desire disorder due to ... [indicate the general medical condition]	
302.73	Female orgasmic disorder	
302.72	Female sexual arousal disorder	
625.8	Female sexual dysfunction, other, due to ... [indicate the general medical condition]	Name slightly reworded to improve sorting.
302.81	Fetishism	
302.89	Frotteurism	
302.xx	Gender identity disorder	
302.6	Gender identity disorder NOS	
302.85	Gender identity disorder, in adolescents or adults	
302.6	Gender identity disorder, in children	
300.02	Generalized anxiety disorder	
305.30	Hallucinogen abuse	
304.50	Hallucinogen dependence	
292.89	Hallucinogen intoxication	
292.81	Hallucinogen intoxication delirium	
292.89	Hallucinogen persisting perception disorder (Flashbacks)	
292.89	Hallucinogen-induced anxiety disorder	
292.84	Hallucinogen-induced mood disorder	
292.xx	Hallucinogen-induced psychotic disorder	
292.11	Hallucinogen-induced psychotic disorder, with delusions	
292.12	Hallucinogen-induced psychotic disorder, with hallucinations	
292.9	Hallucinogen-related disorder NOS	
301.50	Histrionic personality disorder	
307.44	Hypersomnia related to ... [indicate the Axis I or Axis II disorder]	
302.71	Hypoactive sexual desire disorder	
300.7	Hypochondriasis	
313.82	Identity problem	
312.30	Impulse-control disorder NOS	
305.90	Inhalant abuse	
304.60	Inhalant dependence	
292.89	Inhalant intoxication	
292.81	Inhalant intoxication delirium	
292.89	Inhalant-induced anxiety disorder	
292.84	Inhalant-induced mood disorder	
292.82	Inhalant-induced persisting dementia	
292.xx	Inhalant-induced psychotic disorder	
292.11	Inhalant-induced psychotic disorder, with delusions	
292.12	Inhalant-induced psychotic disorder, with hallucinations	
292.9	Inhalant-related disorder NOS	
307.42	Insomnia related to ... [indicate the Axis I or Axis II disorder]	
312.34	Intermittent explosive disorder	
312.32	Kleptomania	
315.9	Learning disorder NOS	
296.xx	Major depressive disorder	
296.3x	Major depressive disorder, recurrent	
296.36	Major depressive disorder, recurrent, in full remission	
296.35	Major depressive disorder, recurrent, in partial remission	
296.31	Major depressive disorder, recurrent, mild	
296.32	Major depressive disorder, recurrent, moderate	
296.33	Major depressive disorder, recurrent, severe without psychotic features	
296.34	Major depressive disorder, recurrent, severe with psychotic features	
296.30	Major depressive disorder, recurrent, unspecified	
296.2x	Major depressive disorder, single episode	
296.26	Major depressive disorder, single episode, in full remission	
296.25	Major depressive disorder, single episode, in partial remission	
296.21	Major depressive disorder, single episode, mild	
296.22	Major depressive disorder, single episode, moderate	
296.24	Major depressive disorder, single episode, severe with psychotic features	
296.23	Major depressive disorder, single episode, severe without psychotic features	
296.20	Major depressive disorder, single episode, unspecified	
608.89	Male dyspareunia due to ... [indicate the general medical condition]	
302.72	Male erectile disorder	
607.84	Male erectile disorder due to ... [indicate the general medical condition]	
608.89	Male hypoactive sexual desire disorder due to ... [indicate the general medical condition]	
302.74	Male orgasmic disorder	
608.89	Male sexual dysfunction, other, due to ... [indicate the general medical condition]	Name slightly reworded to improve sorting.
V65.2	Malingering	
315.1	Mathematics disorder	
333.90	Medication-induced movement disorder NOS	
333.1	Medication-induced postural tremor	
293.9	Mental disorder NOS due to ... [indicate the general medical condition]	
317	Mental retardation, mild	Name slightly reworded to improve sorting.
318.0	Mental retardation, moderate	Name slightly reworded to improve sorting.
318.2	Mental retardation, profound	Name slightly reworded to improve sorting.
318.1	Mental retardation, severe	Name slightly reworded to improve sorting.
319	Mental retardation, severity unspecified	Name slightly reworded to improve sorting.
315.32	Mixed receptive-expressive language disorder	Coded 315.31 in the DSM-IV.
293.83	Mood disorder due to ... [indicate the general medical condition]	
296.90	Mood disorder NOS	
301.81	Narcissistic personality disorder	
347	Narcolepsy	
V61.21	Neglect of child	
333.92	Neuroleptic malignant syndrome	
333.99	Neuroleptic-induced acute akathisia	
333.7	Neuroleptic-induced acute dystonia	
332.1	Neuroleptic-induced Parkinsonism	
333.82	Neuroleptic-induced tardive dyskinesia	
305.1	Nicotine dependence	Coded 305.10 in the DSM-IV.
292.0	Nicotine withdrawal	
292.9	Nicotine-related disorder NOS	
307.47	Nightmare disorder	
V71.09	No diagnosis on Axis II	
V71.09	No diagnosis or condition on Axis I	
V15.81	Noncompliance with treatment	
300.3	Obsessive-compulsive disorder	
301.4	Obsessive-compulsive personality disorder	
V62.2	Occupational problem	
305.50	Opioid abuse	
304.00	Opioid dependence	
292.89	Opioid intoxication	
292.81	Opioid intoxication delirium	
292.0	Opioid withdrawal	
292.84	Opioid-induced mood disorder	
292.xx	Opioid-induced psychotic disorder	
292.11	Opioid-induced psychotic disorder, with delusions	
292.12	Opioid-induced psychotic disorder, with hallucinations	
292.89	Opioid-induced sexual dysfunction	
292.89	Opioid-induced sleep disorder	
292.9	Opioid-related disorder NOS	
313.81	Oppositional defiant disorder	
305.90	Other (or unknown) substance abuse	
304.90	Other (or unknown) substance dependence	
292.89	Other (or unknown) substance intoxication	
292.0	Other (or unknown) substance withdrawal	
292.89	Other (or unknown) substance-induced anxiety disorder	
292.81	Other (or unknown) substance-induced delirium	
292.84	Other (or unknown) substance-induced mood disorder	
292.83	Other (or unknown) substance-induced persisting amnestic disorder	
292.82	Other (or unknown) substance-induced persisting dementia	
292.xx	Other (or unknown) substance-induced psychotic disorder	
292.11	Other (or unknown) substance-induced psychotic disorder, with delusions	
292.12	Other (or unknown) substance-induced psychotic disorder, with hallucinations	
292.89	Other (or unknown) substance-induced sexual dysfunction	
292.89	Other (or unknown) substance-induced sleep disorder	
292.9	Other (or unknown) substance-related disorder NOS	
307.xx	Pain disorder	
307.89	Pain disorder, associated with both psychological factors and a general medical condition	
307.80	Pain disorder, associated with psychological factors	
300.21	Panic disorder with agoraphobia	
300.01	Panic disorder without agoraphobia	
301.0	Paranoid personality disorder	
302.9	Paraphilia NOS	
307.47	Parasomnia NOS	
V61.20	Parent-child relational problem	
V61.10	Partner relational problem	Coded V61.1 in the DSM-IV.
312.31	Pathological gambling	
302.2	Pedophilia	
310.1	Personality change due to ... [indicate the general medical condition]	
301.9	Personality disorder NOS	
299.80	Pervasive developmental disorder NOS	
V62.89	Phase of life problem	
305.90	Phencyclidine abuse	
304.60	Phencyclidine dependence	Coded 304.90 in the DSM-IV.
292.89	Phencyclidine intoxication	
292.81	Phencyclidine intoxication delirium	
292.89	Phencyclidine-induced anxiety disorder	
292.84	Phencyclidine-induced mood disorder	
292.xx	Phencyclidine-induced psychotic disorder	
292.11	Phencyclidine-induced psychotic disorder, with delusions	
292.12	Phencyclidine-induced psychotic disorder, with hallucinations	
292.9	Phencyclidine-related disorder NOS	
315.39	Phonological disorder	
___.__	Physical abuse of adult	Coded V61.1 in the DSM-IV.
V61.12	Physical abuse of adult (if by partner)	Included only in the DSM-IV-TR.
V62.83	Physical abuse of adult (if by person other than partner)	Included only in the DSM-IV-TR.
V61.21	Physical abuse of child	
307.52	Pica	
304.80	Polysubstance dependence	
309.81	Posttraumatic stress disorder	
302.75	Premature ejaculation	
307.44	Primary hypersomnia	
307.42	Primary insomnia	
293.xx	Psychotic disorder due to ... [indicate the general medical condition]	
293.81	Psychotic disorder due to ..., with delusions	
293.82	Psychotic disorder due to ..., with hallucinations	
298.9	Psychotic disorder NOS	
312.33	Pyromania	
313.89	Reactive attachment disorder of infancy or early childhood	
315.00	Reading disorder	
V62.81	Relational problem NOS	
V61.9	Relational problem related to a mental disorder or general medical condition	
V62.89	Religious or spiritual problem	
299.80	Rett's disorder	
307.53	Rumination disorder	
295.70	Schizoaffective disorder	
301.20	Schizoid personality disorder	
295.xx	Schizophrenia	
295.20	Schizophrenia, catatonic type	
295.10	Schizophrenia, disorganized type	
295.30	Schizophrenia, paranoid type	
295.60	Schizophrenia, residual type	
295.90	Schizophrenia, undifferentiated type	
295.40	Schizophreniform disorder	
301.22	Schizotypal personality disorder	
305.40	Sedative, hypnotic, or anxiolytic abuse	
304.10	Sedative, hypnotic, or anxiolytic dependence	
292.89	Sedative, hypnotic, or anxiolytic intoxication	
292.81	Sedative, hypnotic, or anxiolytic intoxication delirium	
292.0	Sedative, hypnotic, or anxiolytic withdrawal	
292.81	Sedative, hypnotic, or anxiolytic withdrawal delirium	
292.89	Sedative-, hypnotic-, or anxiolytic-induced anxiety disorder	
292.84	Sedative-, hypnotic-, or anxiolytic-induced mood disorder	
292.83	Sedative-, hypnotic-, or anxiolytic-induced persisting amnestic disorder	
292.82	Sedative-, hypnotic-, or anxiolytic-induced persisting dementia	
292.xx	Sedative-, hypnotic-, or anxiolytic-induced psychotic disorder	
292.11	Sedative-, hypnotic-, or anxiolytic-induced psychotic disorder, with delusions	
292.12	Sedative-, hypnotic-, or anxiolytic-induced psychotic disorder, with hallucinations	
292.89	Sedative-, hypnotic-, or anxiolytic-induced sexual dysfunction	
292.89	Sedative-, hypnotic-, or anxiolytic-induced sleep disorder	
292.9	Sedative-, hypnotic-, or anxiolytic-related disorder NOS	
313.23	Selective mutism	
309.21	Separation anxiety disorder	
___.__	Sexual abuse of adult	Coded V61.1 in the DSM-IV.
V61.12	Sexual abuse of adult (if by partner)	Included only in the DSM-IV-TR.
V62.83	Sexual abuse of adult (if by person other than partner)	Included only in the DSM-IV-TR.
V61.21	Sexual abuse of child	
302.79	Sexual aversion disorder	
302.9	Sexual disorder NOS	
302.70	Sexual dysfunction NOS	
302.83	Sexual masochism	
302.84	Sexual sadism	
297.3	Shared psychotic disorder	
V61.8	Sibling relational problem	
780.xx	Sleep disorder due to ... [indicate the general medical condition]	
780.54	Sleep disorder due to ..., hypersomnia type	
780.52	Sleep disorder due to ..., insomnia type	
780.59	Sleep disorder due to ..., mixed type	
780.59	Sleep disorder due to ..., parasomnia type	
307.46	Sleep terror disorder	
307.46	Sleepwalking disorder	
300.23	Social phobia	
300.81	Somatization disorder	
300.82	Somatoform disorder NOS	Coded 300.81 in the DSM-IV.
300.82	Somatoform disorder, undifferentiated	Coded 300.81 in the DSM-IV. Name slightly reworded to improve sorting.
300.29	Specific phobia	
307.3	Stereotypic movement disorder	
307.0	Stuttering	
___.__	Substance intoxication delirium	
___.__	Substance withdrawal delirium	
___.__	Substance-induced anxiety disorder	
___.__	Substance-induced mood disorder	
___._	Substance-induced persisting amnestic disorder	
___.__	Substance-induced persisting dementia	
___.__	Substance-induced psychotic disorder	
___.__	Substance-induced sexual dysfunction	
___.__	Substance-induced sleep disorder	
307.20	Tic disorder NOS	
307.23	Tourette's disorder	
307.21	Transient tic disorder	
302.3	Transvestic fetishism	
312.39	Trichotillomania	
300.9	Unspecified mental disorder (nonpsychotic)	
306.51	Vaginismus (not due to a general medical condition)	
290.xx	Vascular dementia	
290.40	Vascular dementia, uncomplicated	
290.41	Vascular dementia, with delirium	
290.42	Vascular dementia, with delusions	
290.43	Vascular dementia, with depressed mood	
302.82	Voyeurism	
316	... [Specified psychological factor] affecting ... [indicate the general medical condition]	
