= List of mental disorders in the DSM-III and DSM-III-R =

This is a list of mental disorders as defined in the DSM-III, the third edition of the Diagnostic and Statistical Manual of Mental Disorders, and their corresponding ICD-10-CM diagnostic codes. Published by the American Psychiatric Association, it was released in 1980, superseding the DSM-II. This list also includes updates featured in the revision of the DSM-III, the DSM-III-R, which was published in 1987.

== Disorders usually first evident in infancy, childhood, or adolescence ==
=== Mental retardation ===
- 317.0x Mild mental retardation
  - 317.01 Mild mental retardation with other behavioral symptoms (Note: Behavioral symptoms must require attention or treatment and must not be part of another disorder)
  - 317.00 Mild mental retardation without other behavioral symptoms
- 318.0x Moderate mental retardation
  - 318.01 Moderate mental retardation with other behavioral symptoms
  - 318.00 Moderate mental retardation without other behavioral symptoms
- 318.1x Severe mental retardation
  - 318.11 Severe mental retardation with other behavioral symptoms
  - 318.10 Severe mental retardation without other behavioral symptoms
- 318.2x Profound mental retardation
  - 318.21 Profound mental retardation with other behavioral symptoms
  - 318.20 Profound mental retardation without other behavioral symptoms
- 319.0x Unspecified mental retardation
  - 319.01 Unspecified mental retardation with other behavioral symptoms
  - 319.00 Unspecified mental retardation without other behavioral symptoms

=== Pervasive developmental disorders ===
- 299.0x Autistic disorder, infantile onset (Note: Listed as infantile autism in the DSM-III)
  - 299.00 Autistic disorder, infantile onset, full syndrome present
  - 299.01 Autistic disorder, infantile onset, residual state{{efn|name="infantile"
- 299.9x Childhood onset pervasive developmental disorder
  - 299.90 Childhood onset pervasive developmental disorder, full syndrome present
  - 299.91 Childhood onset pervasive developmental disorder, residual state
- 299.9x Pervasive developmental disorder, onset unknown or not otherwise specified (Note: Only listed in the DSM-III-R)
  - 299.90 Pervasive developmental disorder, onset unknown or not otherwise specified, full syndrome present
  - 299.91 Pervasive developmental disorder, onset unknown or not otherwise specified, residual
- 299.8x Pervasive developmental disorder not otherwise specified (Note: Listed as pervasive developmental disorder, atypical in the DSM-III)
  - 299.80 Pervasive developmental disorder not otherwise specified, full syndrome present
  - 299.81 Pervasive developmental disorder not otherwise specified, residual state

=== Specific developmental disorders ===
Coded under Axis II.

- 315.39 Developmental articulation disorder
- 315.31 Developmental language disorder (Note: Only listed in the DSM-III)
  - 315.31 Developmental expressive language disorder
  - 315.31 Developmental receptive language disorder
- 315.00 Developmental reading disorder (Note: Listed as developmental reading disorder in the DSM-III)
- 315.90 Developmental expressive writing disorder
- 315.10 Developmental arithmetic disorder
- 315.40 Developmental coordination disorder
- 315.50 Mixed specific developmental disorder
- 315.90 Specific developmental disorder not otherwise specified (Note: Listed as atypical specific developmental disorder in the DSM-III)

=== Other developmental disorders ===
- 315.90 Developmental disorder not otherwise specified

=== Disruptive behavior disorders ===
- 314.01 Attention deficit-hyperactivity disorder (Note: Listed as attention deficit disorder with hyperactivity in the DSM-III) (Note: Listed under attention deficit disorder in the DSM-III)
- 314.00 Attention deficit disorder without hyperactivity
- 314.80 Attention deficit-hyperactivity disorder, residual type (Note: Listed as attention deficit disorder, residual type in the DSM-III)
- 312.90 Conduct disorder (Note: Listed under conduct disorder in the DSM-III)
  - 312.00 Conduct disorder, undersocialized, aggressive
  - 312.10 Conduct disorder, undersocialized, nonaggressive
  - 312.23 Conduct disorder, socialized, aggressive
  - 312.21 Conduct disorder, socialized, nonaggressive
  - 312.20 Conduct disorder, group type
  - 312.00 Conduct disorder, solitary aggressive type
  - 312.90 Conduct disorder, undifferentiated type
  - 312.90 Conduct disorder, atypical
- 313.81 Oppositional defiant disorder (Note: Listed as oppositional disorder in the DSM-III) (Note: Listed under other disorders of infancy, childhood, or adolescence in the DSM-III)

=== Anxiety disorders of childhood or adolescence ===
- 309.21 Separation anxiety disorder
- 313.21 Avoidant disorder of childhood or adolescence
- 313.00 Overanxious disorder

=== Eating disorders ===
- 307.10 Anorexia nervosa
- 307.51 Bulimia nervosa (Note: Listed as bulimia in the DSM-III)
- 307.52 Pica
- 307.53 Rumination disorder of infancy
- 307.50 Eating disorder not otherwise specified (Note: Listed as atypical eating disorder in the DSM-III)

=== Gender identity disorders ===
- 302.60 Gender identity disorder of childhood
- 302.50 Transsexualism (Note: Coded as 302.5x in the DSM-III)
  - 302.51 Transsexualism, asexual
  - 302.52 Transsexualism, homosexual
  - 302.53 Transsexualism, heterosexual
  - 302.50 Transsexualism, unspecified
- 302.89 Gender identity disorder of adolescence or adulthood, nontranssexual type (GIDAANT)
- 302.85 Gender identity disorder not otherwise specified (Note: Listed as atypical gender identity disorder in the DSM-III)

=== Tic disorders ===
- 307.23 Tourette's disorder (Note: Listed under stereotyped movement disorders in the DSM-III)
- 307.22 Chronic motor or vocal tic disorder (Note: Listed as chronic motor tic disorder in the DSM-III)
- 307.21 Transient tic disorder
- 307.20 Tic disorder not otherwise specified (Note: Listed as atypical tic disorder in the DSM-III)

=== Elimination disorders ===
- 307.70 Functional encopresis (Note: Listed under other disorders with physical manifestations in the DSM-III)
- 307.60 Functional enuresis

=== Speech disorders ===
- 307.00 Cluttering
- 307.00 Stuttering

=== Other disorders of infancy, childhood, or adolescence ===
- 313.23 Elective mutism
- 313.82 Identity disorder
- 313.89 Reactive attachment disorder of infancy and early childhood (Note: Listed as reactive attachment disorder of infancy in the DSM-III)
- 307.30 Stereotypy/habit disorder (Note: Listed as atypical stereotyped movement disorder in the DSM-III)
- 313.22 Schizoid disorder of childhood or adolescence
- 314.00 Undifferentiated attention-deficit disorder

== Organic mental disorders ==
=== Organic brain syndromes with etiology unknown or listed outside of the mental disorders section of the ICD-9-CM ===
- 293.00 Delirium
- 294.10 Dementia
- 294.00 Amnestic syndrome
- 293.81 Organic delusional syndrome
- 293.82 Organic hallucinosis
- 293.83 Organic mood syndrome (Note: Listed as organic affective syndrome in the DSM-III)
- 294.80 Organic anxiety syndrome
- 310.10 Organic personality syndrome
- 294.80 Organic mental syndrome not otherwise specified (Note: Listed as atypical or mixed organic brain syndrome in the DSM-III)

=== Dementias arising in the senium and presenium ===
- 290.00 Primary degenerative dementia of the Alzheimer type, senile onset, uncomplicated (Note: Listed as primary degenerative dementia, senile onset, uncomplicated in the DSM-III)
- 290.30 Primary degenerative dementia of the Alzheimer type, senile onset, with delirium (Note: Listed as primary degenerative dementia, senile onset, with delirium in the DSM-III)
- 290.20 Primary degenerative dementia of the Alzheimer type, senile onset, with delusions (Note: Listed as primary degenerative dementia, senile onset, with delusions in the DSM-III)
- 290.21 Primary degenerative dementia of the Alzheimer type, senile onset, with depression (Note: Listed as primary degenerative dementia, senile onset, with depression in the DSM-III)
- 290.1x Primary degenerative dementia of the Alzheimer type, presenile onset (Note: Not coded in the DSM-III-R) (Note: Listed as primary degenerative dementia, presenile onset in the DSM-III)
  - 290.10 Primary degenerative dementia of the Alzheimer type, presenile onset, uncomplicated (Note: Listed as primary degenerative dementia, presenile onset, uncomplicated in the DSM-III)
  - 290.11 Primary degenerative dementia of the Alzheimer type, presenile onset, with delirium (Note: Listed as primary degenerative dementia, presenile onset, with delirium in the DSM-III)
  - 290.12 Primary degenerative dementia of the Alzheimer type, presenile onset, with delusions (Note: Listed as primary degenerative dementia, presenile onset, with delusions in the DSM-III)
  - 290.13 Primary degenerative dementia of the Alzheimer type, presenile onset, with depression (Note: Listed as primary degenerative dementia, presenile onset, with depression in the DSM-III)
- 290.4x Multi-infarct dementia
  - 290.40 Multi-infarct dementia, uncomplicated
  - 290.41 Multi-infarct dementia, with delirium
  - 290.42 Multi-infarct dementia, with delusions
  - 290.43 Multi-infarct dementia, with depression
- 290.00 Senile dementia not otherwise specified
- 290.10 Presenile dementia not otherwise specified

== Psychoactive substance use disorders ==
=== Psychoactive substance-induced organic mental disorders ===
- 303.00 Alcohol intoxication
- 291.40 Idiosyncratic alcohol intoxication
- 291.80 Alcohol withdrawal
- 291.00 Alcohol withdrawal delirium
- 291.30 Alcohol hallucinosis
- 291.10 Alcohol amnestic disorder
- 291.20 Dementia associated with alcoholism
- 305.70 Amphetamines and related substances intoxication (Note: Listed as amphetamine or similarly acting sympathomimetic intoxication in the DSM-III) (Note: Also coded as 327.30)
- 292.00 Amphetamines and related substances withdrawal (Note: Listed as amphetamine or similarly acting sympathomimetic withdrawal in the DSM-III) (Note: Also coded as 327.31)
- 292.81 Amphetamines and related substances delirium (Note: Listed as amphetamine or similarly acting sympathomimetic delirium in the DSM-III) (Note: Also coded as 327.32)
- 292.11 Amphetamines and related substances delusional disorder (Note: Listed as amphetamine or similarly acting sympathomimetic delusional disorder in the DSM-III) (Note: Also coded as 327.35)
- 305.90 Caffeine intoxication (Note: Also coded as 327.80)
- 305.20 Cannabis intoxication (Note: Also coded as 327.60)
- 292.11 Cannabis delusional disorder (Note: Also coded as 327.65)
- 305.60 Cocaine intoxication (Note: Also coded as 327.20)
- 292.00 Cocaine withdrawal
- 292.81 Cocaine delirium
- 292.11 Cocaine delusional disorder
- 292.11 Hallucinogen delusional disorder (Note: Also coded as 327.55)
- 292.84 Hallucinogen mood disorder (Note: Listed as hallucinogen affective disorder in the DSM-III) (Note: Also coded as 327.57)
- 305.30 Hallucinogen hallucinosis (Note: Also coded as 327.56)
- 292.89 Posthallucinogen perception disorder
- 305.90 Inhalant intoxication
- 292.00 Nicotine withdrawal (Note: Listed as tobacco withdrawal in the DSM-III) (Note: Also coded as 327.71)
- 305.50 Opioid intoxication (Note: Also coded as 327.10)
- 292.00 Opioid withdrawal (Note: Also coded as 327.11)
- 305.90 Phencyclidine (PCP) and related substances intoxication (Note: Listed as phencyclidine (PCP) or similarly acting arylcyclohexylamine intoxication in the DSM-III) (Note: Also coded as 327.40)
- 292.81 Phencyclidine (PCP) and related substances delirium (Note: Listed as phencyclidine (PCP) or similarly acting arylcyclohexylamine delirium in the DSM-III) (Note: Also coded as 327.42)
- 292.11 Phencyclidine (PCP) and related substances delusional disorder (Note: Listed as phencyclidine (PCP) or similarly acting arylcyclohexylamine delusional disorder in the DSM-III)
- 292.84 Phencyclidine (PCP) and related substances mood disorder
- 292.90 Phencyclidine (PCP) or similarly acting arylcyclohexylamine mixed organic mental disorder (Note: Also coded as 327.49)
- 305.40 Sedative, hypnotic, or anxiolytic intoxication (Note: Listed as barbiturate or similarly acting sedative or hypnotic intoxication in the DSM-III) (Note: Also coded as 327.00)
- 292.00 Sedative, hypnotic, or anxiolytic withdrawal (Note: Listed as barbiturate or similarly acting sedative or hypnotic withdrawal in the DSM-III) (Note: Also coded as 327.01)
- 292.00 Sedative, hypnotic, or anxiolytic withdrawal delirium (Note: Listed as barbiturate or similarly acting sedative or hypnotic withdrawal delirium in the DSM-III) (Note: Also coded as 327.02)
- 292.83 Sedative, hypnotic, or anxiolytic amnestic disorder (Note: Listed as barbiturate or similarly acting sedative or hypnotic amnestic disorder in the DSM-III) (Note: Also coded as 327.04)
- 305.90 Other drug or unspecified psychoactive substance intoxication (Note: Listed as other or unspecified substance intoxication in the DSM-III) (Note: Also coded as 327.90)
- 292.00 Other drug or unspecified psychoactive substance withdrawal (Note: Listed as other or unspecified substance withdrawal in the DSM-III) (Note: Also coded as 327.91)
- 292.81 Other drug or unspecified psychoactive substance-induced delirium (Note: Listed as other or unspecified substance delirium in the DSM-III) (Note: Also coded as 327.92)
- 292.82 Other drug or unspecified psychoactive substance-induced dementia (Note: Listed as other or unspecified substance dementia in the DSM-III) (Note: Also coded as 327.93)
- 292.83 Other drug or unspecified psychoactive substance-induced amnestic disorder (Note: Listed as other or unspecified substance amnestic disorder in the DSM-III) (Note: Also coded as 327.94)
- 292.11 Other drug or unspecified psychoactive substance-induced delusional disorder (Note: Listed as other or unspecified substance delusional disorder in the DSM-III) (Note: Also coded as 327.95)
- 292.12 Other drug or unspecified psychoactive substance-induced hallucinosis (Note: Listed as other or unspecified substance hallucinosis in the DSM-III) (Note: Also coded as 327.96)
- 292.84 Other drug or unspecified psychoactive substance-induced mood disorder (Note: Listed as other or unspecified substance affective disorder in the DSM-III) (Note: Also coded as 327.97)
- 292.89 Other drug or unspecified psychoactive substance-induced personality disorder (Note: Listed as other or unspecified substance personality disorder in the DSM-III) (Note: Also coded as 327.98)
- 292.89 Other drug or unspecified psychoactive substance-induced anxiety disorder
- 292.90 Organic mental disorder not otherwise specified (Note: Listed as other or unspecified substance atypical or mixed organic mental disorder in the DSM-III) (Note: Also coded as 327.99)

=== Psychoactive substance dependence disorders ===
- 304.90 Polysubstance dependence
  - 304.7x Dependence on combination of opioid and other non-alcoholic substance
    - 304.71 Dependence on combination of opioid and other non-alcoholic substance, continuous
    - 304.72 Dependence on combination of opioid and other non-alcoholic substance, episodic
    - 304.73 Dependence on combination of opioid and other non-alcoholic substance, in remission
    - 304.70 Dependence on combination of opioid and other non-alcoholic substance, unspecified
  - 304.8x Dependence on combination of substances, excluding opioids and alcohol
    - 304.81 Dependence on combination of substances, excluding opioids and alcohol, continuous
    - 304.82 Dependence on combination of substances, excluding opioids and alcohol, episodic
    - 304.83 Dependence on combination of substances, excluding opioids and alcohol, in remission
    - 304.80 Dependence on combination of substances, excluding opioids and alcohol, unspecified
- 304.90 Psychoactive substance dependence not otherwise specified
  - 304.6x Other specified substance dependence
    - 304.61 Other specified substance dependence, continuous
    - 304.62 Other specified substance dependence, episodic
    - 304.63 Other specified substance dependence, in remission
    - 304.60 Other specified substance dependence, unspecified
  - 304.9x Unspecified substance dependence
    - 304.91 Unspecified substance dependence, continuous
    - 304.92 Unspecified substance dependence, episodic
    - 304.93 Unspecified substance dependence, in remission
    - 304.90 Unspecified substance dependence, unspecified
- 305.0x Alcohol abuse
  - 305.01 Alcohol abuse, continuous
  - 305.02 Alcohol abuse, episodic
  - 305.03 Alcohol abuse, in remission
  - 305.00 Alcohol abuse, unspecified
- 303.90 Alcohol dependence (alcoholism) (Note: Coded as 303.9x in the DSM-III)
  - 303.91 Alcohol dependence (alcoholism), continuous
  - 303.92 Alcohol dependence (alcoholism), episodic
  - 303.93 Alcohol dependence (alcoholism), in remission
  - 303.90 Alcohol dependence (alcoholism), unspecified
- 305.4x Barbiturate or similarly acting sedative or hypnotic abuse
  - 305.41 Barbiturate or similarly acting sedative or hypnotic abuse, continuous
  - 305.42 Barbiturate or similarly acting sedative or hypnotic abuse, episodic
  - 305.43 Barbiturate or similarly acting sedative or hypnotic abuse, in remission
  - 305.40 Barbiturate or similarly acting sedative or hypnotic abuse, unspecified
- 304.10 Barbiturate or similarly acting sedative or hypnotic dependence (Note: Coded as 304.1x in the DSM-III)
  - 304.11 Barbiturate or similarly acting sedative or hypnotic dependence, continuous
  - 304.12 Barbiturate or similarly acting sedative or hypnotic dependence, episodic
  - 304.13 Barbiturate or similarly acting sedative or hypnotic dependence, in remission
  - 304.10 Barbiturate or similarly acting sedative or hypnotic dependence, unspecified
- 305.5x Opioid abuse
  - 305.51 Opioid abuse, continuous
  - 305.52 Opioid abuse, episodic
  - 305.53 Opioid abuse, in remission
  - 305.50 Opioid abuse, unspecified
- 304.00 Opioid dependence (Note: Coded as 304.0x in the DSM-III)
  - 304.01 Opioid dependence, continuous
  - 304.02 Opioid dependence, episodic
  - 304.03 Opioid dependence, in remission
  - 304.00 Opioid dependence, unspecified
- 305.6x Cocaine abuse
  - 305.61 Cocaine abuse, continuous
  - 305.62 Cocaine abuse, episodic
  - 305.63 Cocaine abuse, in remission
  - 305.60 Cocaine abuse, unspecified
- 304.20 Cocaine dependence
- 305.7x Amphetamine or similarly acting sympathomimetic abuse
  - 305.71 Amphetamine or similarly acting sympathomimetic abuse, continuous
  - 305.72 Amphetamine or similarly acting sympathomimetic abuse, episodic
  - 305.73 Amphetamine or similarly acting sympathomimetic abuse, in remission
  - 305.70 Amphetamine or similarly acting sympathomimetic abuse, unspecified
- 304.40 Amphetamine or similarly acting sympathomimetic dependence (Note: Coded as 304.4x in the DSM-III)
  - 304.41 Amphetamine or similarly acting sympathomimetic dependence, continuous
  - 304.42 Amphetamine or similarly acting sympathomimetic dependence, episodic
  - 304.43 Amphetamine or similarly acting sympathomimetic dependence, in remission
  - 304.40 Amphetamine or similarly acting sympathomimetic dependence, unspecified
- 305.9x Phencyclidine (PCP) or similarly acting arylcyclohexylamine abuse (Note: Also coded as 328.4x)
  - 305.91 Phencyclidine (PCP) or similarly acting arylcyclohexylamine abuse, continuous
  - 305.92 Phencyclidine (PCP) or similarly acting arylcyclohexylamine abuse, episodic
  - 305.93 Phencyclidine (PCP) or similarly acting arylcyclohexylamine abuse, in remission
  - 305.90 Phencyclidine (PCP) or similarly acting arylcyclohexylamine abuse, unspecified
- 304.50 Phencyclidine (PCP) or similarly acting arylcyclohexylamine dependence
- 305.3x Hallucinogen abuse
  - 305.31 Hallucinogen abuse, continuous
  - 305.32 Hallucinogen abuse, episodic
  - 305.33 Hallucinogen abuse, in remission
  - 305.30 Hallucinogen abuse, unspecified
- 304.50 Hallucinogen dependence
- 305.2x Cannabis abuse
  - 305.21 Cannabis abuse, continuous
  - 305.22 Cannabis abuse, episodic
  - 305.23 Cannabis abuse, in remission
  - 305.20 Cannabis abuse, unspecified
- 304.30 Cannabis dependence (Note: Coded as 304.4x in the DSM-III)
  - 304.31 Cannabis dependence, continuous
  - 304.32 Cannabis dependence, episodic
  - 304.33 Cannabis dependence, in remission
  - 304.30 Cannabis dependence, unspecified
- 305.10 Tobacco dependence (Note: Coded as 305.1x in the DSM-III)
  - 305.11 Tobacco dependence, continuous
  - 305.12 Tobacco dependence, episodic
  - 305.13 Tobacco dependence, in remission
  - 305.10 Tobacco dependence, unspecified
- 304.60 Inhalant dependence
- 305.9x Other, mixed, or unspecified substance abuse
  - 305.91 Other, mixed, or unspecified substance abuse, continuous
  - 305.92 Other, mixed, or unspecified substance abuse, episodic
  - 305.93 Other, mixed, or unspecified substance abuse, in remission
  - 305.90 Other, mixed, or unspecified substance abuse, unspecified

== Schizophrenia ==
- 295.2x Schizophrenia, catatonic
  - 295.21 Schizophrenia, catatonic, subchronic
  - 295.22 Schizophrenia, catatonic, chronic
  - 295.23 Schizophrenia, catatonic, subchronic with acute exacerbation
  - 295.24 Schizophrenia, catatonic, chronic with acute exacerbation
  - 295.25 Schizophrenia, catatonic, in remission
  - 295.20 Schizophrenia, catatonic, unspecified
- 295.1x Schizophrenia, disorganized
  - 295.11 Schizophrenia, disorganized, subchronic
  - 295.12 Schizophrenia, disorganized, chronic
  - 295.13 Schizophrenia, disorganized, subchronic with acute exacerbation
  - 295.14 Schizophrenia, disorganized, chronic with acute exacerbation
  - 295.15 Schizophrenia, disorganized, in remission
  - 295.10 Schizophrenia, disorganized, unspecified
- 295.3x Schizophrenia, paranoid
  - 295.31 Schizophrenia, paranoid, subchronic
  - 295.32 Schizophrenia, paranoid, chronic
  - 295.33 Schizophrenia, paranoid, subchronic with acute exacerbation
  - 295.34 Schizophrenia, paranoid, chronic with acute exacerbation
  - 295.35 Schizophrenia, paranoid, in remission
  - 295.30 Schizophrenia, paranoid, unspecified
- 295.9x Schizophrenia, undifferentiated
  - 295.91 Schizophrenia, undifferentiated, subchronic
  - 295.92 Schizophrenia, undifferentiated, chronic
  - 295.93 Schizophrenia, undifferentiated, subchronic with acute exacerbation
  - 295.94 Schizophrenia, undifferentiated, chronic with acute exacerbation
  - 295.95 Schizophrenia, undifferentiated, in remission
  - 295.90 Schizophrenia, undifferentiated, unspecified
- 295.6x Schizophrenia, residual
  - 295.61 Schizophrenia, residual, subchronic
  - 295.62 Schizophrenia, residual, chronic
  - 295.63 Schizophrenia, residual, subchronic with acute exacerbation
  - 295.64 Schizophrenia, residual, chronic with acute exacerbation
  - 295.65 Schizophrenia, residual, in remission
  - 295.60 Schizophrenia, residual, unspecified

== Delusional (paranoid) disorder ==
- 297.10 Delusional (paranoid) disorder (Note: Listed as paranoia in the DSM-III)
- 297.30 Shared paranoid disorder
- 298.30 Acute paranoid disorder
- 297.90 Atypical paranoid disorder

== Psychotic disorders not elsewhere classified ==
- 295.80 Brief reactive psychosis
- 295.40 Schizophreniform disorder
- 295.70 Schizoaffective disorder
- 297.30 Induced psychotic disorder
- 298.90 Psychotic disorder not otherwise specified (Note: Listed as atypical psychosis in the DSM-III)

== Mood disorders ==
=== Bipolar disorder ===
- 296.6x Bipolar disorder, mixed
  - 296.60 Bipolar disorder, mixed, unspecified
  - 296.61 Bipolar disorder, mixed, mild
  - 296.62 Bipolar disorder, mixed, moderate
  - 296.62 Bipolar disorder, mixed, without melancholia (Note: Applies to major depressive episode(s) only)
  - 296.62 Bipolar disorder, mixed, without psychotic features (Note: Applies to manic episode(s) only)
  - 296.63 Bipolar disorder, mixed, severe without psychotic features
  - 296.63 Bipolar disorder, mixed, with melancholia
  - 296.64 Bipolar disorder, mixed, severe with psychotic features
  - 296.64 Bipolar disorder, mixed, with psychotic features
  - 296.65 Bipolar disorder, mixed, in partial remission
  - 296.66 Bipolar disorder, mixed, in full remission (Note: Listed as bipolar disorder, mixed, in remission in the DSM-III)
  - 296.67 Bipolar disorder, mixed, with mood-incongruent psychotic features (Note: Unofficial fifth-digit specifier)
- 296.4x Bipolar disorder, manic
  - 296.40 Bipolar disorder, manic, unspecified
  - 296.41 Bipolar disorder, manic, mild
  - 296.42 Bipolar disorder, manic, moderate
  - 296.42 Bipolar disorder, manic, without psychotic features
  - 296.43 Bipolar disorder, manic, severe without psychotic features
  - 296.44 Bipolar disorder, manic, severe with psychotic features
  - 296.44 Bipolar disorder, manic, with psychotic features
  - 296.45 Bipolar disorder, manic, in partial remission
  - 296.46 Bipolar disorder, manic, in full remission (Note: Listed as bipolar disorder, manic, in remission in the DSM-III)
  - 296.47 Bipolar disorder, manic, with mood-incongruent psychotic features
- 296.5x Bipolar disorder, depressed
  - 296.50 Bipolar disorder, depressed, unspecified
  - 296.51 Bipolar disorder, depressed, mild
  - 296.52 Bipolar disorder, depressed, moderate
  - 296.52 Bipolar disorder, depressed, without melancholia
  - 296.53 Bipolar disorder, depressed, severe without psychotic features
  - 296.53 Bipolar disorder, depressed, with melancholia
  - 296.54 Bipolar disorder, depressed, severe with psychotic features
  - 296.54 Bipolar disorder, depressed, with psychotic features
  - 296.55 Bipolar disorder, depressed, in partial remission
  - 296.56 Bipolar disorder, depressed, in full remission (Note: Listed as bipolar disorder, depressed, in remission in the DSM-III)
  - 296.57 Bipolar disorder, depressed, with mood-incongruent psychotic features
- 301.13 Cyclothymia (Note: Listed as cyclothymic disorder in the DSM-III) (Note: Listed under other specific affective disorders in the DSM-III)
- 296.70 Bipolar disorder not otherwise specified (Note: Listed as atypical bipolar disorder in the DSM-III) (Note: Listed under atypical affective disorders in the DSM-III)

=== Depressive disorders ===
- 296.2x Major depression, single episode
  - 296.20 Major depression, single episode, unspecified
  - 296.21 Major depression, single episode, mild
  - 296.22 Major depression, single episode, moderate
  - 296.22 Major depression, single episode, without melancholia
  - 296.23 Major depression, single episode, severe without psychotic features
  - 296.23 Major depression, single episode, with melancholia
  - 296.24 Major depression, single episode, severe with psychotic features
  - 296.24 Major depression, single episode, with psychotic features
  - 296.25 Major depression, single episode, in partial remission
  - 296.26 Major depression, single episode, in full remission (Note: Listed as major depression, single episode, in remission in the DSM-III)}
  - 296.27 Major depression, single episode, with mood-incongruent psychotic features
- 296.3x Major depression, recurrent
  - 296.30 Major depression, recurrent, unspecified
  - 296.31 Major depression, recurrent, mild
  - 296.32 Major depression, recurrent, moderate
  - 296.32 Major depression, recurrent, without melancholia
  - 296.33 Major depression, recurrent, severe without psychotic features
  - 296.33 Major depression, recurrent, with melancholia
  - 296.34 Major depression, recurrent, severe with psychotic features
  - 296.34 Major depression, recurrent, with psychotic features
  - 296.35 Major depression, recurrent, in partial remission
  - 296.36 Major depression, recurrent, in full remission (Note: Listed as major depression, recurrent, in remission in the DSM-III)
  - 296.37 Major depression, recurrent, with mood-incongruent psychotic features
- 300.40 Dysthymia (or depressive neurosis) (Note: Listed as dysthymic disorder (or depressive neurosis) in the DSM-III)
- 296.82 Depressive disorder not otherwise specified (Note: Listed as atypical depression in the DSM-III)

== Anxiety disorders (anxiety and phobic neuroses) ==
- 300.21 Panic disorder with agoraphobia (Note: Listed as agoraphobia with panic attacks in the DSM-III)
- 300.01 Panic disorder without agoraphobia (Note: Listed as panic disorder in the DSM-III)
- 300.22 Agoraphobia without history of panic disorder (Note: Listed as agoraphobia without panic attacks in the DSM-III)
- 300.23 Social phobia
- 300.29 Simple phobia
- 300.30 Obsessive compulsive disorder (or obsessive compulsive neurosis)
- 309.89 Post-traumatic stress disorder (Note: Not coded in the DSM-III)
  - 308.30 Post-traumatic stress disorder, acute
  - 309.81 Post-traumatic stress disorder, chronic or delayed
- 300.02 Generalized anxiety disorder
- 300.00 Anxiety disorder not otherwise specified (Note: Listed as atypical anxiety disorder in the DSM-III)

== Somatoform disorders ==
- 300.70 Body dysmorphic disorder
- 300.11 Conversion disorder (or hysterical neurosis, conversion type)
- 300.70 Hypochondriasis (or hypochondriacal neurosis)
- 300.81 Somatization disorder (Briquet's syndrome) (Note: Listed as somatization disorder in the DSM-III)
- 307.80 Somatoform pain disorder (Note: Listed as psychogenic pain disorder in the DSM-III)
- 300.70 Undifferentiated somatoform disorder
- 300.70 Somatoform disorder not otherwise specified (Note: Listed as atypical somatoform disorder in the DSM-III) (Note: Also coded as 300.71)

== Dissociative disorders (hysterical neuroses, dissociative type) ==
- 300.14 Multiple personality disorder (Note: Listed as multiple personality in the DSM-III)
- 300.13 Psychogenic fugue
- 300.12 Psychogenic amnesia
- 300.60 Depersonalization disorder (or depersonalization neurosis)
- 300.15 Dissociative disorder not otherwise specified (Note: Listed as atypical dissociative disorder in the DSM-III)

== Sexual disorders ==
=== Paraphilias ===
- 302.40 Exhibitionism
- 302.81 Fetishism
- 302.89 Frotteurism
- 302.20 Pedophilia
- 302.83 Sexual masochism
- 302.84 Sexual sadism
- 302.30 Transvestic fetishism (Note: Listed as transvestism in the DSM-III)
- 302.82 Voyeurism
- 302.10 Zoophilia
- 302.90 Paraphilia not otherwise specified (Note: Listed as atypical paraphilia in the DSM-III)

=== Sexual dysfunctions ===
- 302.71 Hypoactive sexual desire disorder (Note: Listed as inhibited sexual desire in the DSM-III)
- 302.72 Inhibited sexual excitement
  - 302.72 Female sexual arousal disorder
  - 302.72 Male erectile disorder
- 302.73 Inhibited female orgasm
- 302.74 Inhibited male orgasm
- 302.75 Premature ejaculation
- 302.76 Functional dyspareunia
- 306.51 Functional vaginismus
- 302.70 Sexual dysfunction not otherwise specified (Note: Listed as atypical sexual dysfunction in the DSM-III)

=== Other sexual disorders ===
- 302.00 Ego-dystonic homosexuality
- 302.89 Sexual disorder not otherwise specified (Note: Listed as psychosexual disorder not elsewhere classified in the DSM-III)

== Sleep and arousal disorders ==
=== Dyssomnias ===
- 307.42 Insomnia related to another mental disorder (nonorganic)
- 780.50 Insomnia related to a known organic factor
- 307.42 Primary insomnia
- 307.44 Hypersomnia related to another mental disorder (nonorganic}
- 780.50 Hypersomnia related to a known organic factor
- 780.54 Primary hypersomnia
- 307.45 Sleep-wake schedule disorder
- 307.40 Dyssomnia not otherwise specified

=== Parasomnias ===
- 307.47 Dream anxiety disorder (nightmare disorder)
- 307.46 Sleep terror disorder (Note: Also coded as 307.49)
- 307.46 Sleepwalking disorder
- 307.47 Parasomnia not otherwise specified

== Factitious disorders ==
- 301.51 Chronic factitious disorder with physical symptoms
- 301.51 Factitious disorder with physical symptoms
- 300.16 Factitious disorder with psychological symptoms
- 300.19 Factitious disorder not otherwise specified (Note: Listed as atypical facticious disorder with physical symptoms in the DSM-III)

== Disorders of impulse control not elsewhere classified ==
- 312.34 Intermittent explosive disorder
- 312.32 Kleptomania
- 312.31 Pathological gambling
- 312.33 Pyromania
- 312.39 Trichotillomania
- 312.35 Isolated explosive disorder
- 312.39 Impulse control disorder not otherwise specified (Note: Listed as atypical impulse control disorder in the DSM-III)

== Adjustment disorder ==
- 309.24 Adjustment disorder with anxious mood
- 309.00 Adjustment disorder with depressed mood
- 309.30 Adjustment disorder with disturbance of conduct
- 309.40 Adjustment disorder with mixed disturbance of emotions and conduct
- 309.28 Adjustment disorder with mixed emotional features
- 309.82 Adjustment disorder with physical complaints
- 309.83 Adjustment disorder with withdrawal
- 309.23 Adjustment disorder with work (or academic) inhibition
- 309.90 Adjustment disorder not otherwise specified (Note: Listed as adjustment disorder with atypical features in the DSM-III)

== Psychological factors affecting physical condition ==
Physical condition coded on axis III.

- 316.00 Psychological factors affecting physical condition

== Personality disorders ==
Coded on axis II.

- 301.00 Paranoid personality disorder
- 301.20 Schizoid personality disorder
- 301.22 Schizotypal personality disorder
- 301.70 Antisocial personality disorder
- 301.83 Borderline personality disorder
- 301.50 Histrionic personality disorder (hysterical personality) (Note: Listed as histrionic personality disorder in the DSM-III)
- 301.81 Narcissistic personality disorder
- 301.82 Avoidant personality disorder
- 301.60 Dependent personality disorder
- 301.40 Obsessive-compulsive personality disorder (Note: Listed as obsessive personality disorder in the DSM-III)
- 301.84 Passive-aggressive personality disorder
- 301.89 Personality disorder not otherwise specified (Note: Listed as atypical, mixed, or other personality disorder in the DSM-III)

== V codes for conditions not attributable to a mental disorder that are a focus of attention or treatment ==
- V62.30 Academic problem
- V71.01 Adult antisocial behavior
- V62.89 Borderline intellectual functioning (Note: Also coded as V62.88) (Note: Coded on Axis II)
- V71.02 Childhood or adolescent antisocial behavior
- V65.20 Malingering
- V61.10 Marital problem
- V15.81 Noncompliance with medical treatment
- V62.20 Occupational problem
- V61.20 Parent-child problem
- V62.81 Other interpersonal problem
- V61.80 Other specified family circumstances
- V62.89 Phase of life problem or other life circumstance problem
- V62.82 Uncomplicated bereavement

== Additional codes ==
- 300.90 Unspecified mental disorder (nonpsychotic)
- V71.09 No diagnosis or condition on Axis I
- 799.90 Diagnosis or condition deferred on Axis I
- V71.09 No diagnosis or condition on Axis II
- 799.90 Diagnosis or condition deferred on Axis II

== Sources ==
- American Psychiatric Association (1980). Diagnostic and Statistical Manual of Mental Disorders (3rd ed.). American Psychiatric Association. ISBN 978-0521315289.
- American Psychiatric Association (1987). Diagnostic and Statistical Manual of Mental Disorders (3rd revised ed.). American Psychiatric Association. ISBN 978-0890420188.
- Reid, William H.; Wise, Michael G. (1989-01-01). DSM-III-R Training Guide: For Use With the American Psychiatric Association's Diagnostic and Statistical Manual of Mental Disorders, 3rd Revised Edition. Brunner-Mazel. ISBN 978-0876305072.
- "DSM-III-R Classification: Axes I and II Categories and Codes". Psychiatric News. 20 (20): 9–10. 1985. doi:10.1176/appi.pn.1985.20.20.16.
