= Identity problem =

Identity problem may refer to:

- An additional psychiatric condition from DSM-IV, code 313.82. See also: Identity disorder;
- A constant problem in mathematics, an indistinctness over whether an expression equals zero.
