= Identity disorder (disambiguation) =

Identity disorder may refer to:

- Identity disorder: a state listed in the Diagnostic and Statistical Manual of Mental Disorders
- Identity crisis
- Existential crisis
- Personality disorder
