= Borderline intellectual functioning =

- Other names: Borderline mental retardation, borderline mental subnormality, borderline mental deficiency, borderline mental disability, borderline intelligence, deficientia intelligentiæ, backwardness
- Specialty: Psychiatry

Borderline intellectual functioning, previously called borderline mental retardation (in the ICD-8), is a categorization of intelligence wherein a person has below average cognitive ability (generally an IQ of 70–85), but the deficit is not as severe as intellectual disability (below 70). It is sometimes called below average IQ (BAIQ). This is technically a cognitive impairment; however, this group may not be sufficiently mentally disabled to be eligible for specialized services.

== Codes ==
The DSM-IV-TR code of borderline intellectual functioning is V62.89. DSM-5 diagnosis codes are V62.89 and R41.83.

== Learning skills ==
During school years, individuals with borderline intellectual functioning are often "slow learners". Although a large percentage of this group fails to complete high school and can often achieve only a low socioeconomic status, most adults in this group blend in with the rest of the population.

== Differential diagnosis ==
According to the DSM-5, differentiating borderline intellectual functioning and mild intellectual disability requires careful assessment of adaptive and intellectual functions and their variations, especially in the presence of co-morbid psychiatric disorders that may affect patient compliance with standardized test (for example, attention deficit hyperactivity disorder (ADHD) with severe impulsivity or schizophrenia).

== See also ==
- IQ classification
- Special education
