= Cocaine intoxication =

- Other names: Cocaine toxicity, Cocaine poisoning, Cocaine overdose
- Cocaine
- Specialty: Toxicology

Cocaine intoxication refers to the subjective, desired and adverse effects of cocaine on the mind and behavior of users. Both self-induced and involuntary cocaine intoxication have medical and legal implications (even in absence of relevant adverse effects).

Adverse effects can develop over time due to repeated use and so become chronic conditions. However, even a one-time intake of the substance can result in severe acute intoxication.

Recurrent cocaine use and dependence to the drug inevitably leads to the reduction of the desired effects perceived by the users, while the occurrence of adverse effects of intoxication increase. The last can sometimes be completely reversed without bearing consequences but they can also potentially kill the users (e.g., in cases of untreated or non-manageable overdoses).

== Signs and symptoms ==
Cocaine increases alertness, feelings of well-being, euphoria, energy, sociability, and sexuality. The former are some of the desired effects of cocaine intoxication. Mild adverse effects include anxiety, increased temperature, paranoia, restlessness, and teeth grinding. With prolonged use, the drug can cause chronic complications like insomnia, weight loss, anorexia, persistent tachycardia, heart failure, kidney failure, hallucinations, and paranoid delusions.

Depression with suicidal ideation may develop in heavy users. Finally, a loss of vesicular monoamine transporters, neurofilament proteins, and other morphological changes appear to indicate a long-term damage to dopamine neurons. Chronic intranasal usage can degrade the cartilage separating the nostrils (the nasal septum), which can eventually lead to its complete disappearance, a condition known as Cocaine-Induced Midline Destructive Lesions (CIMDL).

Studies have shown that cocaine usage during pregnancy triggers premature labor and may lead to placental abruption.

In cases of severe acute intoxication, potentially lethal adverse effects include prolonged episodes of arrhythmia (i.e., a group of abnormal heart rhythms that also include tachycardia), heavy hypoglycemia, tremors, convulsions, hyperthermia (i.e., markedly increased core temperature), untreated uremia, myocardial infarction, stroke, and sudden cardiac arrest.

=== Overdose ===
US yearly overdose deaths involving cocaine.

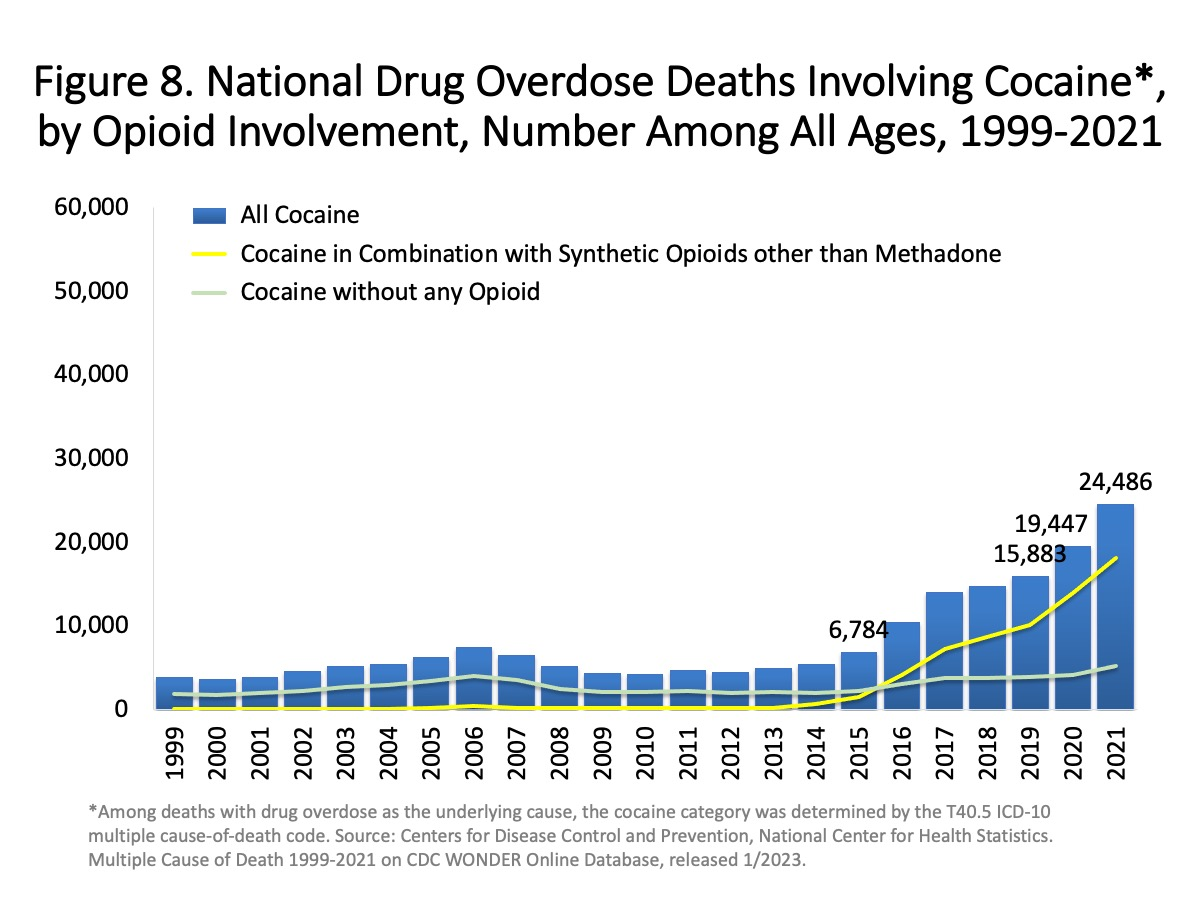
US. Opioid involvement in cocaine overdose deaths. Green line is cocaine and any opioid. Gray line is cocaine without any opioids. Yellow line is cocaine and other synthetic opioids.

Cocaine can be snorted, swallowed, injected, or smoked. Most deaths due to cocaine are accidental but may also be the result of body packing or stuffing with rupture in the gastrointestinal tract. Use of cocaine causes abnormally fast heart rhythms and a marked elevation of blood pressure (hypertension), which can be life-threatening. This can lead to death from acute myocardial infarction, acute respiratory failure (i.e., hypoxemia, with or without hypercapnia), stroke, cerebral hemorrhage, and sudden cardiac arrest. Cocaine overdose may result in hyperthermia as stimulation and increased muscular activity cause greater heat production. Heat loss is also inhibited by the cocaine-induced vasoconstriction. Cocaine and/or associated hyperthermia may cause muscle cell destruction (rhabdomyolysis) and myoglobinuria resulting in kidney failure. Individuals with cocaine overdose should be transported immediately to the nearest emergency department, preferably by ambulance in case cardiac arrest occurs en route. According to the National Institute on Drug Abuse, approximately 14,600 deaths occurred in the US in 2017 due to an overdose where cocaine was somehow involved in any capacity, defined or undefined. Because of the increase in heart rate, cocaine users can be prone to elevated body temperatures, tremors, chest pains, and subject to nausea and vomiting. Some psychological symptoms due to an overdose include paranoia, delirium, anxiety as well as panicked feelings. Some signs of an overdose of cocaine are difficulty breathing, loss of urine control, bluish color of the skin, loss of awareness or surroundings, and high blood pressure. Death can also be caused from an over intoxication of cocaine, especially if high doses are taken. Most severe overdoses occur when users combine cocaine with other substances like alcohol or heroin, which increase the effects and heighten the chances of having a dangerous overdose. Treating an overdose can be done by bringing back blood flow to the heart, and restoring the body with oxygen rich blood, especially for the brain to reduce the risk of stroke. Cocaine overdoses have fluctuated over the years. From 2006 to 2010 there has been a decline in the number of reported cases. Though, from 2010 to 2015 there has been an increase in the reported cases involving over cocaine intoxication. Males appear to have a much higher chance of overdosing than females. The ratio of male to female cocaine overdoses is 3:1.

=== Withdrawal ===
Cocaine withdrawal is not as severe as the withdrawal from other substances. For example, substances like heroin, alcohol and benzodiazepines can involve severe physical withdrawal symptoms while cocaine results in mostly psychological symptoms. Physiological changes caused by cocaine withdrawal include vivid and unpleasant dreams, insomnia, hypersomnia, anger, increased appetite, weight gain, psychomotor retardation, agitation, depression, and anxiety. According to a study done by Gawin and Kleber in 1986, there are three phases in the withdrawal process. They observed the behavior of 30 cocaine-dependent individuals. Phase one, the crash, is characterized by acute dysphoria, irritability and anxiety, increased desire for sleep, exhaustion, increased appetite, decreased craving to use. Phase two, withdrawal, is characterized by increasing craving to use, poor concentration, some irritability and some lethargy, which persisted for up to 10 weeks. Lastly, phase three is characterized by the intermittent craving to use in the context of external cues. Cocaine and its metabolites are eliminated from the body by 3 days. There are not any FDA-approved medications that specifically help treat cocaine withdrawal, however, there are some useful medications that could possibly help individuals overcome their addiction. One example is propranolol. Propranolol is a beta blocker that has been approved to treat hypertension, angina, anxiety, and other related psychological problems. Buprenorphine and naltrexone are two substances that act as an effective treatment in the earlier stages of withdrawal.

== Pathophysiology ==
Cocaine pharmacodynamics involve multiple complex mechanisms. Although it has a short half-life (~ 1 hour), cocaine metabolites, which rise in concentrations several hours after cocaine ingestion, persist in circulation for up to 24 hours, and may cause delayed or recurrent coronary vasoconstriction. This drug binds and blocks monoamine (dopamine, epinephrine, norepinephrine, and serotonin) re-uptake transporters with equal affinity. Monoamines accumulate in the synaptic cleft resulting in enhanced and prolonged sympathetic effects. Cocaine's acute effect in the central nervous system is to raise the amount of dopamine and serotonin in the nucleus accumbens (the pleasure center in the brain). When this effect ceases due to metabolism of cocaine, depletion of associated neurotransmitters, and receptor down-regulation (tachyphylaxis), the cocaine user may experience dysphoria, or a "crash" after the initial high. The principal actions of cocaine on the cardiovascular system are from alpha- and beta-1-adrenoceptor stimulation resulting in increased heart rate, systemic arterial pressure, and myocardial contractility, which are major determinants of myocardial oxygen demand. Cocaine and its metabolites may cause arterial vasoconstriction hours after use. Epicardial coronary arteries are especially vulnerable to these effects, leading to decreased myocardial oxygen supply. Cocaine-induced platelet activation and thrombus formation is another deleterious effect, caused by alpha-adrenergic- and adenosine diphosphate-mediated increase in platelet aggregation. Plasminogen activator inhibitor is also increased following cocaine use, thereby promoting thrombosis. Cocaine acts like a class I antiarrhythmic agent by blocking sodium and potassium channels, in a similar way of local anesthetics such as lidocaine and interferes with action potential propagation. This Vaughn-Williams class IC effect increases the risk of conduction disturbance and tachyarrhythmias. Adding to its complex toxicity, cocaine targets muscarinic acetylcholine, N-methyl-D-aspartate (NMDA), sigma, and kappa-opioid receptors.

== Management ==
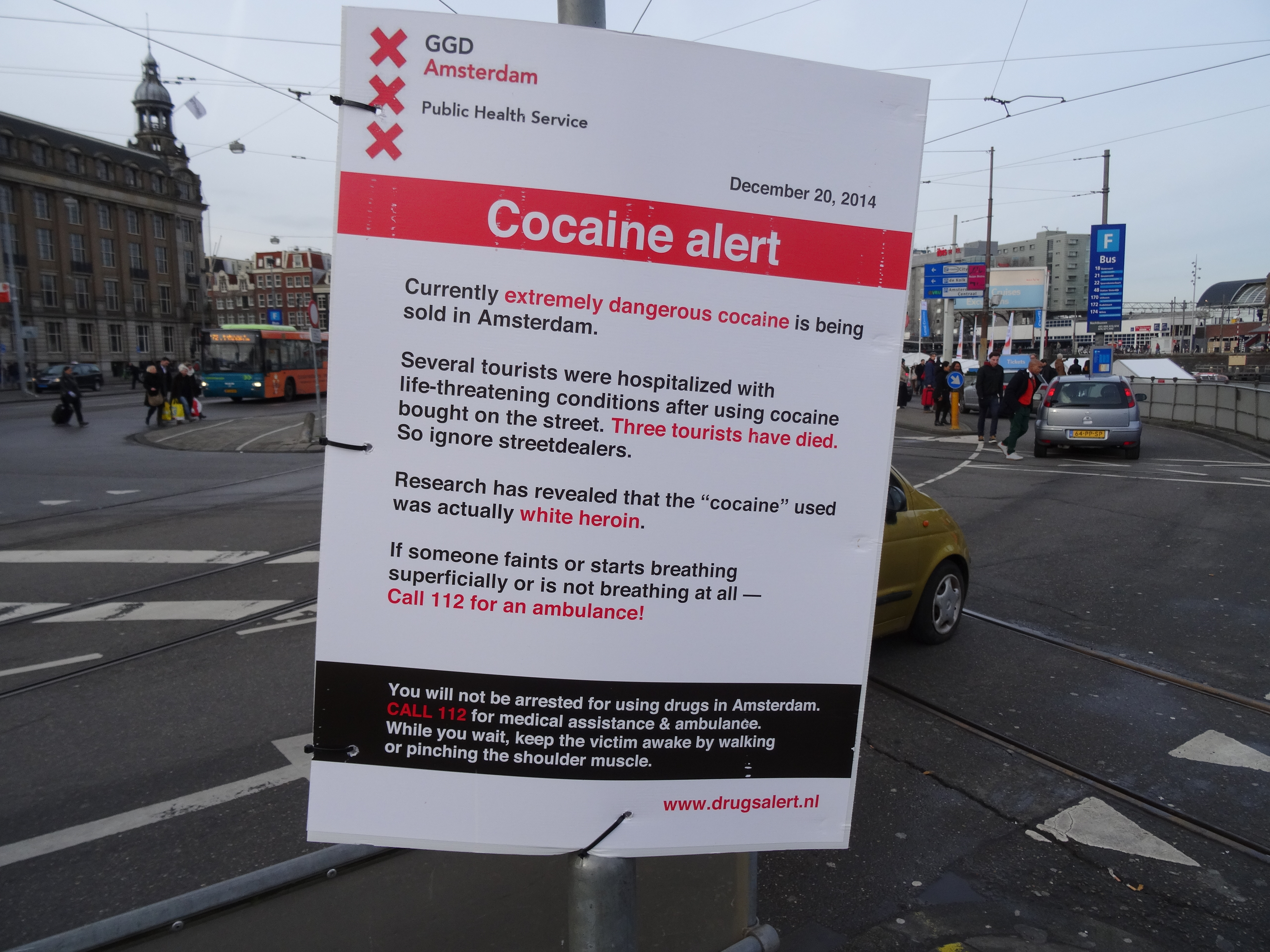
A "cocaine alert" sign posted by GGD Amsterdam: the sign reminds people to "Call 112 for an ambulance."

There is no specific antidote for cocaine. Emergency treatment of cocaine-associated high body temperature consists of giving a benzodiazepine and physical cooling. Immediate administration of aspirin is required for patients reporting cocaine-associated chest pain. Cooling is best accomplished with tepid water misting and cooling with a fan. Antipyretics (e.g., paracetamol) have no effect in lowering high temperature because cocaine is an muscarinic receptor agonist.

The chest pain, high blood pressure, and increased heart rate caused by cocaine may be also treated with benzodiazepines. Multiple and escalating dose of benzodiazepines may be necessary to achieve effect, which increases risk of over-sedation and respiratory depression. A review of cocaine cardiovascular toxicity found benzodiazepines may not always reliably lower heart rate and blood pressure. Lidocaine and intravenous lipid emulsion have been successfully used for serious ventricular tachyarrhythmias in several case reports.

People who are agitated are best treated with benzodiazepines, though antipsychotics such as haloperidol and olanzapine may also be useful. The alpha-2 agonist dexmedetomidine may also be useful for agitation, but effects on heart rate and blood pressure are variable based on several studies and case reports.

=== Vasodilators ===
Nitric-oxide mediated vasodilators, such as nitroglycerin and nitroprusside, are effective at lowering blood pressure and reversing coronary arterial vasoconstriction, but not heart rate. Nitroglycerin is useful for cocaine-induced chest pain, but the possibility of reflex tachycardia must be considered.

=== Alpha blockers ===
Alpha-blockers such as phentolamine have been recommended and may be used to treat cocaine-induced hypertension and coronary arterial vasoconstriction, but these agents do not reduce heart rate. Furthermore, phentolamine is rarely used, not readily available in many emergency departments, and many present-day clinicians are unfamiliar with its use.

=== Beta blockers ===
Although the use of beta blockers is still controversial, notwithstanding decades of practice, despite research papers and systematic reviews on this subject (more details are in the next section), the intravenous racemic mixture of labetalol, a non-selective β blocker and selective α_{1} blocker is recommended for treating concomitant hypertension and tachycardia. Furthermore, the use of labetalol is approved by a AHA/ACC guideline for people who have used cocaine and methamphetamine with unstable angina/non-STEMI.

A relative contraindication to the use of beta-blockers is still evident in some guidelines for the treatment of cocaine toxicity despite limited evidence. The phenomenon of "unopposed alpha-stimulation," in which blood pressure increases or coronary artery vasoconstriction worsens after blockade of beta-2 vasodilation in people using cocaine, is controversial. This rarely-encountered and unpredictable adverse effect has resulted in some clinicians advocating for an absolute contraindication of all beta-blockers, including specific, non-specific, and mixed. Many clinicians have disregarded this dogma and administer beta-blockers for cocaine-related chest pain and acute coronary syndrome, especially when there is demand ischemia from uncontrolled tachycardia. Of the 1,744 people in the aforementioned systematic review, only 7 adverse events were from putative cases of "unopposed alpha-stimulation" due to propranolol (n=3), esmolol (n=3), and metoprolol (n=1). Some detractors of beta-blockers for cocaine-induced chest pain have cited minimal acute mortality and the short half-life of the medication, making it unnecessary to aggressively treat any associated tachycardia and hypertension. However, the long-term effect of cocaine use and development of heart failure, with early mortality, high morbidity, and tremendous demand on hospital utilization should be taken under consideration.

=== Calcium channel blockers ===
Calcium channel blockers may also be used to treat hypertension and coronary arterial vasoconstriction, but fail to lower tachycardia based on all cocaine-related studies. Non-dihydropyridine calcium channels blockers such as diltiazem and verapamil are preferable, as dihydropyridine agents such as nifedipine have much higher risk of reflex tachycardia (however, clinicians can prevent reflex tachycardia by administering beta-blockers some minutes before using the latter class of CCBs).

== Legal implications ==
A situation wherein a person's cognitive faculties are impaired due to cocaine use is what constitutes drug intoxication per law in much of the United States, Europe, and most of the rest of the world, and can be a serious charge depending on one's actions while intoxicated (e.g., in drug-impaired driving), or other circumstances surrounding the acquisition of the drug.

== See also ==
- Cocaine Anonymous
- Cocaine dependence
- Cocaine-Induced Midline Destructive Lesions
- Cocaine § Cocaine nose
- Crack cocaine § Crack lung
- List of deaths from drug overdose and intoxication
