= Nightmare disorder =

Sleep disorder

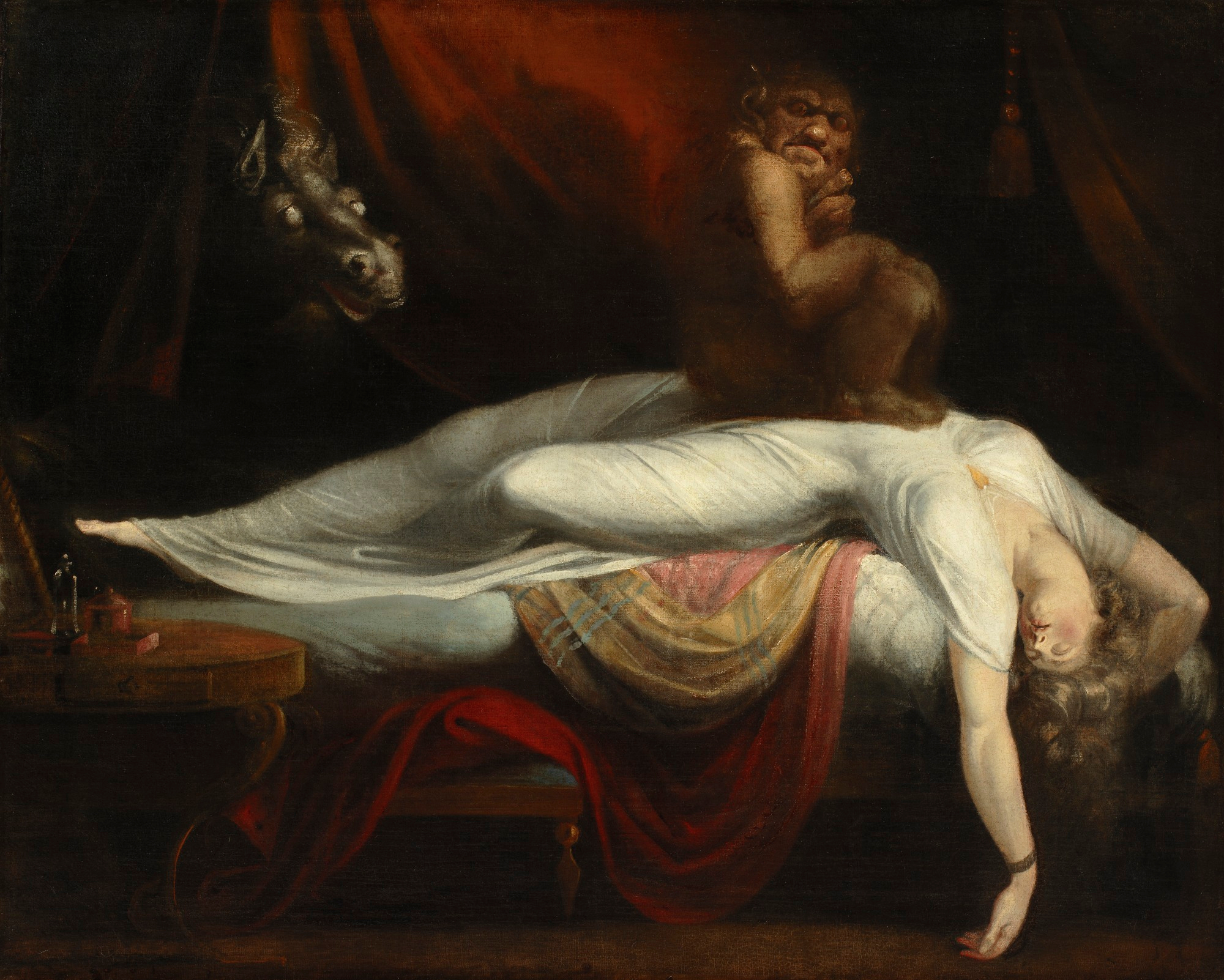
- The Nightmare, by Johann Heinrich Füssli
- Specialty: Psychiatry
- Frequency: c. 4%

Nightmare disorder is a sleep disorder characterized by repeated or deliberate intense nightmares that most often center on threats to physical safety and security. The nightmares usually occur during the REM stage of sleep, and the person who experiences the nightmares typically remembers them well upon waking. More specifically, nightmare disorder is a type of parasomnia, a subset of sleep disorders categorized by abnormal movement or behavior or verbal actions during sleep or shortly before or after. Other parasomnias include sleepwalking, sleep terrors, bedwetting, and sleep paralysis.

Nightmare disorders can be confused with sleep terror disorders. The difference is that after a sleep terror episode, the patient wakes up with more dramatic symptoms than with a nightmare disorder, such as screaming and crying. Furthermore, they do not remember the reason of the fear, while a patient with a nightmare disorder remembers every detail of the dream. Finally, the sleep terrors usually occur during NREM Sleep.

Nightmares also have to be distinguished from bad dreams, which are less emotionally intense. Furthermore, nightmares contain more scenes of aggression and bad endings than bad dreams, which are usually dreams of interpersonal conflict. Finally, people experiencing nightmares feel more fear than with bad dreams.

The treatment depends on whether or not there is a comorbid PTSD diagnosis. About 4% of American adults are affected. Studies examining nightmare disorders have found that the prevalence rates ranges 2–6% with the prevalence being similar in the US, Canada, France, Iceland, Sweden, Belgium, Finland, Austria, Japan, and the Middle East.

== Signs and symptoms ==
During the nightmare, the sleeper may scream and yell out things. The nightmare sufferer is often awakened by these threatening, frightening dreams and can often vividly remember their experience. Upon awakening, the sleeper is usually alert and oriented within their surroundings, but may have an increased heart rate and symptoms of anxiety, like sweating. They may have trouble falling back to sleep for fear they will experience another nightmare.

A person experiencing nightmare disorder may have trouble going through everyday tasks; anxiety and lack of sleep caused by the fearful dreams may hinder the individual from completing everyday tasks efficiently and correctly. Upon experiencing this, these nightmare sufferers may consult with a psychiatrist.

The sleeper may have recurring episodes of awakening while recalling the intensely disturbing dream manifestations which usually result from fear or anxiety, but can also be triggered by anger, sadness, disgust, and other dysphoric emotions. Additionally, the sleeper may experience at least one of the following two features: delayed return of going back to sleep after episodes, and having episodes in the latter half of the sleep period.

=== Consequences ===
Nightmare disorder is common: it affects about 4% of the adult population. Even if children have more nightmares than adults, only 1% of children meet the criteria of the disorder. Nightmare disorder can impair the quality of life for people who are affected by the condition. It can make the patient avoid sleep, which leads to sleep deprivation, which in turn may lead to even more intense nightmares. Some other consequences of the nightmare disorder are fatigue and insomnia.

Nightmare disorders have negative consequences on several aspects of the patient's life, such as sleep, cognitive and emotional functioning and well-being. Nightmares can also have negative impact on the bed partner's life.

=== Content of idiopathic nightmares ===
Physical aggression is the main theme of nightmares. Other fields, such as interpersonal conflict, failure, helplessness, apprehension, being chased, accidents, evil forces, disasters, insects and environmental abnormalities may also feature in nightmares. Fear is the most frequent emotion associated with nightmares, even if other emotions such as sadness, anger, and confusion can also be present.

== Criteria ==
According to the International Classification of Sleep Disorders, the criteria needed to diagnose a nightmare disorder are the following. First, the presence of frequent nightmares that imply danger for the person and impact mood in a negative way is needed. Second, when waking up from nightmares, the person behaves in an alert way. Finally, the disorder has to have a significant impact on the patient's personal, social or professional functioning, in areas like mood, sleep, cognition, behaviour, fatigue, family and occupation.

== Causes ==
Nightmares can be caused by extreme pressure or irritation if no other mental disorder is discovered. The death of a loved one or a stressful life event can be enough to cause a nightmare, but conditions such as post-traumatic stress disorder and other psychiatric disorders have been known to cause nightmares as well. If the individual is on medication, the nightmares may be attributed to some side effects of the drug. Amphetamines, antidepressants, and stimulants like cocaine and caffeine can cause nightmares. Blood pressure medication, levodopa and medications for Parkinson's disease have also been known to cause nightmares.

The nightmares may be idiopathic or could be associated with psychiatric disorders like post-traumatic stress disorder, schizophrenia, and borderline personality disorder. Nightmares can also be triggered by stress and anxiety and substance abuse, such as drugs that affect the neurotransmitters norepinephrine and dopamine and serotonin. Nevertheless, causality between drugs such as beta-blockers or alpha-agonists and nightmares is still unclear and further research needs to be done to investigate the biochemical mechanisms of nightmares.

Eighty percent of patients who have PTSD report nightmares. Patients with PTSD have symptoms that are classified into three clusters: intrusive/re-experiencing, numbing, and hyperarousal. Nightmares are usually considered to be part of the intrusive/re-experiencing symptom.

Some differences exist between idiopathic and PTSD related nightmares. A person with PTSD having nightmares would wake up during the night more frequently and for a longer time than with idiopathic nightmares. Consequently, people with PTSD would have a poorer sleep quality. Furthermore, nightmares related to PTSD would be more stressful than idiopathic ones. However, further studies have to be conducted in this area to obtain more reliable results.

== Assessment ==
Polysomnography records physiological parameters, such as electroencephalography (EEG), electromyography (EMG) and electrooculography (EOG) in a sleep laboratory. However, the frequency of posttraumatic nightmares tends to decrease in an artificial lab setting, which would impact the content of nightmares. Consequently, assessment of nightmare disorders using polysomnography has to last for a longer period, in order to let the patient get used to the artificial environment.

Self-report by a questionnaire or by a diary is another way to investigate nightmare disorders. However, these methods are questionable. Indeed, when filling out questionnaires with questions about a long period, people often tend to underestimate the frequency of their nightmares because of forgetting. On the contrary, filling out a diary every day may lead to an overestimation of the numbers of nightmares, because of the focusing on this phenomenon.

== Comorbidity ==
Studies have reported that nightmare disorders were present in 50–70% of the cases for PTSD, in 17.5% for depression, in 18.3% for insomnia, in 16.7% for schizophrenia and in 49% for borderline personality disorder. For all psychiatric disorders taken together, nightmare disorders are present in 29.9% of the cases, a much bigger rate than for the general population, which is 2–5%. Nightmare disorders can also be associated with sleep disorders such as night terrors, chronic insomnia and sleep-disordered breathing. The presence of nightmares before a trauma would influence severity of PTSD symptoms. Furthermore, having nightmares is linked to a significantly higher risk of attempting suicide and of death by suicide.

== Treatment ==
Stress reduction techniques such as yoga, meditation and exercise may help to eliminate stress and create a more peaceful sleeping atmosphere.

Diagnosis and medication can only be given to patients that report the recurring nightmares to a psychiatrist or other physician. Medications like prazosin are sometimes used to treat nightmares in people with PTSD. Therapy usually helps to deal with the frightening themes of the nightmares and alleviate the recurrence of the dreams. The persistent nightmares will usually improve as the patient gets older. Therapy is usually efficient to treat chronic nightmares in PTSD disorder or in other population.

Eye Movement Desensitization and Reprocessing (EMDR) is a specialized intervention in which the focus is to stimulate neural mechanisms to induce disturbing memories and experiences. It has demonstrated a significant nightmares' reduction, especially for the treatment of PTSD. Silver, Brooks and Obenchain have found a decrease of the nightmares with Vietnam War veterans after 90 days of EMDR. Jayatunge has found significant results with people who have survived to a tsunami. Greenwald has successfully used the EMDR with children. There wasn't any negative consequence due to the EMDR sessions.

Imagery rehearsal therapy is a cognitive behavioral therapy where the patient rescripts the nightmare in any way they choose and then practices the new dream they choose to have using imagery. It has been shown as efficient to treat nightmare disorder in PTSD as well as in non PTSD populations. In this treatment, the person has to write a new scenario of the nightmare with positive images that will be rehearsed during 10 to 20 minutes per day, in order to change the negative content of the nightmare. Cognitive behavioral therapy for insomnia (CBT-I) is also efficient to treat nightmares in the PTSD population. This method aims to change sleep habits with a clinician's help and the use of tools such as a sleep diary. Although many studies have been done in which positive results were recorded, there are few studies in which results were inconclusive or had a delayed effect.

Exposure, relaxation and rescripting therapy is used to treat PTSD-related nightmares. This intervention combines Imagery Rehearsal Therapy with exposure and relaxation techniques. The main objective is to work on changing maladjusted sleep habits and the trauma-related themes of nightmares.

Research has been undertaken to investigate if sufferers of nightmares could benefit from the ability to be aware that they are indeed dreaming, a process known as lucid dreaming. The Lucid Dreaming Therapy is a specific method of the Imagery Rehearsal Therapy. The dreamer is conscious during their dream and can modulate it. Consequently, anxiety decreases, controllability increases, expectations change, which will impact the frequency of nightmares. Several studies have shown significant results with the lucid dreaming therapy. Two studies indicate a decrease of the nightmare frequency after only 12 weeks and one study shows, in 80% of the cases, a total disappearance of the nightmares after one year. Although these studies showed the efficacy of this therapy in the reduction of nightmare frequency on patients from the general population, so far evidence for this treatment is still weak.

Systematic Desensitization, using graduated exposure, has been shown to be efficient to treat chronic nightmares. The person has to face the frightening elements of nightmares in a gradual way, from least to most stressful. When the person starts to feel unsecure, she has to manage the stress by applying a relaxation technique.

=== Pharmacological treatments ===
Pharmacological treatments could be also efficient to treat nightmare disorder. Most of the treatments were assessed to patients with PTSD. The most efficient is an alpha-blocker, Prazosin, which reduces tone during sleep by blocking noradrenergic receptors. Prazosin would significantly decrease the number of PTSD related nightmares and would therefore improve sleep quality. However, only few studies considered the effect of Prazosin in idiopathic nightmares. Benzodiazepines are also often used to treat nightmare disorder, despite the lack of efficacy demonstrated in empirical studies. Some patients were also treated with atypical antipsychotic medications. Olanzapine has quickly decreased the nightmares. Two studies have shown the positive effects of Risperidone. Aripiprazole is more tolerated than olanzapine and has demonstrated substantial improvement in the nightmare frequency. Some other drugs as clonidine, cyproheptadine, fluvoxamine, gabapentin, nabilone, phenelzine, topiramate or trazodone have presented an amelioration of the nightmares. But some further researches are needed. Medication has shown efficacy to treat chronic nightmares among a PTSD population but the impact of pharmacological treatments on other populations, such as drug-related nightmares, are unknown. Furthermore, patients usually take more than one medication at a time, whatever the cause related to nightmares, leading to possible interactive effects.

== Epidemiology ==
About 2–6% of American adults are affected by nightmare disorders. About 4% of American adults are affected by nightmare disorders. Women seem to be more affected than men, the ratio being 2–4 : 1. This inequality decreases with aging because of a less high prevalence in elderly women. The rate of nightmares increases from ages 10–19 to 20–39, and then decreases during the ages of 50–59. The rates of nightmares for men increases from ages 10–19 to 30–39, and then decreases at the age of 50–59. However, it is still unclear if the difference of prevalence between men and women is real or if it reflects a higher dream recall capacity of women.

According to studies, children at the age of 6–10 years are 41% more likely to experience nightmares and 22% at the age of 11. Children with persistent nightmares range from 10% to 50%. However, only 1% of children meet the criteria of a nightmare disorder. Some factors tend to predict the development of a disorder from the presence of nightmares during childhood, such as a fear of going to sleep or going back to bed after a nightmare, an irregular sleep life and an avoidance of thinking about the nightmare.

== Research ==
- Dissociative disorders are usually paired with Nightmare Disorder 57% of the time. Nightmare disorder is believed to be associated with Dissociative Disorders as a defense mechanism that is used to escape from the traumatic event that caused the Dissociative Disorder. People with Dissociative Disorder and Nightmare disorder are more likely to self-mutilate, attempt suicide, and have Borderline Personality Disorder.
- Borderline personality disorder with Nightmare Disorder is very common, since the stages of sleep vary from that of a normal person (i.e. increased stage one sleep, and less stage four sleep). People with Borderline Personality disorder and Nightmare Disorder are usually the severest of those who have Borderline Personality Disorder; therefore, treating those with Nightmare Disorder may also help some with Borderline Personality Disorder.
- Hypnosis seems to be a new and effective treatment for those with Nightmare Disorder, since it increases relaxation.
- Nightmare disorder is also associated with those who have lower cholesterol. This connection is unclear; however, cholesterol may affect other hormones in the body (such as serotonin) which may affect one's sleep.
