= Identity disorder =

Type of mental disorder

Identity disorder in the DSM was first listed as a separate diagnosis in version III (1980). In the DSM-IV (1994), it was replaced by "Identity problem", which was not defined as a mental disorder per se, but was listed in the chapter "Other Conditions That May Be a Focus of Clinical Attention". Identity disorder was 'downgraded' to Identity problem as research indicated that distress over one's identity is so common that it might very well be considered part of the normality. In practice, if a person's distress persisted or worsened, an Identity problem would often be succeeded by a diagnosis of an actual disorder, such as a mood disorder or borderline personality disorder. In the DSM-5 (2013), Identity problem was removed.

== See also ==
- Body integrity dysphoria, sometimes called body integrity identity disorder
- Dissociative identity disorder
- Gender dysphoria, previously called gender identity disorder
- Identity crisis
- Self (-concept, -image, -knowledge, -schema)
