= Betty Pfefferbaum =

American psychiatrist and academic

Betty Pfefferbaum is a psychiatrist known for her early work in mental health treatment for children after a disaster. She is the director of the Terrorism and Disaster Center in the College of Medicine at Oakland University.

== Research and career ==
Pfefferbaum worked on clinical services and research related to survivors of the Oklahoma City bombing, 1998 United States embassy bombings in Kenya, the September 11 attacks and Hurricanes Katrina and Rita. She was Lead Investigator on multiple research projects for the National Consortium for the Study of Terrorism and Responses to Terrorism and has published a large volume of research papers related to mental health treatment post disaster or terrorism, especially dealing with children.

== Education ==
Pfefferbaum studied at the University of California, Los Angeles, and became a general and child psychiatrist. She also completed legal training and is a member of the Oklahoma Bar Association.

== Selected publications ==
- Melissa Bernstein; Betty Pfefferbaum (16 May 2018). "Posttraumatic Growth as a Response to Natural Disasters in Children and Adolescents". Current Psychiatry Reports. 20 (5): 37. doi:10.1007/S11920-018-0900-4. ISSN 1523-3812. PMID 29766312. Wikidata Q60961707.
- B. Pfefferbaum (1 December 2001). "The impact of the Oklahoma City bombing on children in the community". Military Medicine. 166 (12 Suppl): 49–50. ISSN 0026-4075. PMID 11778433. Wikidata Q42043042.
- Practice Guideline for the Treatment of Patients With Acute Stress Disorder and Posttraumatic Stress Disorder, doi:10.1176/APPI.BOOKS.9780890423363.52257, Wikidata Q56826283
- Betty Pfefferbaum; Pascal Nitiéma; Elana Newman (26 March 2019). "Is Viewing Mass Trauma Television Coverage Associated With Trauma Reactions in Adults and Youth? A Meta-Analytic Review". Journal of Traumatic Stress. 32 (2): 175–185. doi:10.1002/JTS.22391. ISSN 0894-9867. PMID 30913350. Wikidata Q92628647.
- Betty Pfefferbaum; Phebe Tucker; Rose L Pfefferbaum; Summer D Nelson; Pascal Nitiéma; Elana Newman (5 March 2018). "Media Effects in Youth Exposed to Terrorist Incidents: a Historical Perspective". Current Psychiatry Reports. 20 (2): 11. doi:10.1007/S11920-018-0875-1. ISSN 1523-3812. PMID 29504064. Wikidata Q87958141.

== See also ==
- Emergency psychiatry
