= Obsessive–compulsive personality disorder =

Personality disorder involving orderliness

- Other names: Anankastic personality disorder
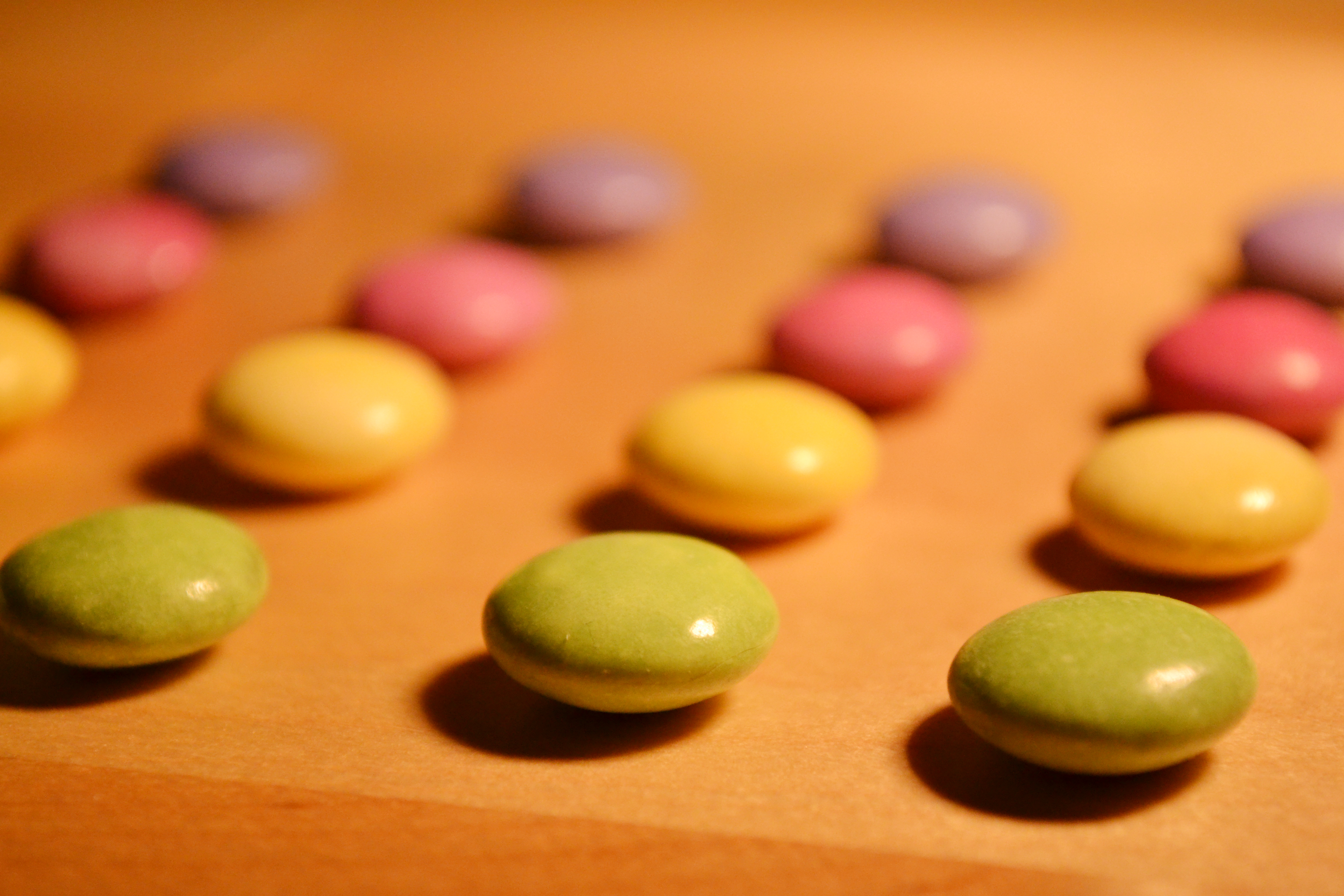
- A symptom of OCPD is a great attention to detail.
- Specialty: Psychiatry
- Symptoms: Obsession with rules and order; perfectionism; excessive devotion to productivity; inability to delegate tasks; zealotry on matters of morality; rigidity and stubbornness
- Usual onset: Adolescence to early adulthood
- Risk factors: Negative life experiences, genetics
- Differential diagnosis: Obsessive–compulsive disorder, personality disorders, substance use disorder, personality disorder due to another medical condition
- Treatment: Psychotherapy
- Frequency: 3%

Obsessive–compulsive personality disorder (OCPD) is a personality disorder marked by a spectrum of obsessions with rules, lists, schedules, and order, among other things. Symptoms are usually present by the time a person reaches adulthood, and are visible in a variety of situations. The cause of OCPD is thought to involve a combination of genetic and environmental factors, namely problems with attachment, but in some individuals there may be a link to brain trauma or Parkinson's disease.

Obsessive–compulsive personality disorder is distinct from obsessive–compulsive disorder (OCD), and the relation between the two is contentious. Some studies have found high comorbidity rates between the two disorders but others have shown little comorbidity. Both disorders may share outside similarities, such as rigid and ritual-like behaviors. OCPD is highly comorbid with other personality disorders, autism spectrum, eating disorders, anxiety, mood disorders, and substance use disorders. People with OCPD are seldom conscious of their actions, while people with OCD tend to be aware of how their condition affects the way they act.

The disorder is the most common personality disorder in the United States, and is diagnosed twice as often in males than in females; however, there is evidence to suggest the prevalence between men and women is equal.

== Signs and symptoms ==
Obsessive–compulsive personality disorder (OCPD) is marked by an excessive obsession with rules, lists, schedules, and order; a need for perfection that interferes with efficiency and the ability to complete tasks; a devotion to productivity that hinders interpersonal relationships and leisure time; rigidity and zealousness on matters of morality and ethics; an inability to delegate responsibilities or work to others; restricted functioning in interpersonal relationships; restricted expression of emotion and affect; and a need for control over one's environment and self.

Some of OCPD's symptoms are persistent and stable, whilst others are unstable. The obsession with perfectionism, reluctance to delegate tasks to others, and rigidity and stubbornness are stable symptoms. On the other hand, the symptoms that were most likely to change over time were the miserly spending style and the excessive devotion to productivity. This discrepancy in the stability of symptoms may lead to mixed results in terms of the course of the disorder, with some studies showing a remission rate of 58% after a 12-month period, whilst others suggest that the symptoms are stable and may worsen with age.

=== Attention to order and perfection ===
People with OCPD tend to be obsessed with controlling their environments; to satisfy this need for control, they become preoccupied with trivial details, lists, procedures, rules, and schedules.

This preoccupation with details and rules makes the person unable to delegate tasks and responsibilities to others unless they submit to their exact way of completing a task, because they believe there is only one correct way to do something. They stubbornly insist that a task or job must be completed their way, and only their way, and may micromanage people when they are assigned a group task. They are frustrated when other people suggest alternative methods. A person with this disorder may reject help even when they desperately need it, as they believe that only they can do something correctly.

People with OCPD are obsessed with maintaining perfection. Perfectionism and the extremely high standards they set are detrimental and may cause delays and failures in completing objectives and tasks. Mistakes are generally exaggerated. For example, a person may write an essay and, believing it falls short of perfection, continue rewriting it, missing the deadline or even failing to complete the task. The subject may remain unaware that others become frustrated and annoyed by repeated delay and inconvenience so caused. Work relationships may then become a source of tension.

=== Rigidity ===
Individuals with OCPD are overconscientious, scrupulous, and rigid, and inflexible on matters of morality, ethics, and other areas of life. They may force themselves and others to follow rigid moral principles and strict standards of performance. They are self-critical and harsh about their mistakes. These symptoms should not be accounted for or caused by a person's culture or religion. Their view of the world is polarised and dichotomous; there is no grey area between what is right and what is wrong. Whenever this dichotomous view of the world cannot be applied to a situation, this causes internal conflict as the person's perfectionist tendencies are challenged. This also prevents them from understanding the ideas, beliefs, and values of other people, and from changing their views, especially on matters of morality and politics.

=== Devotion to productivity ===
Individuals with OCPD devote themselves to work and productivity at the expense of interpersonal relationships and recreation. Economic necessity, such as poverty, cannot account for this behavior. They may believe that they do not have sufficient time to relax because they have to prioritize their work above all. They may refuse to spend time with friends and family because of that. They may find it difficult to go on a vacation, and even if they book one, they may keep postponing it so it never happens. They may feel uncomfortable when they do go on a vacation and will take something along with them so they can work. They choose hobbies that are organized and structured, and they approach them as serious tasks requiring effort to perfect. The devotion to productivity in OCPD, however, is distinct from work addiction. OCPD is controlled and egosyntonic, whereas work addiction is uncontrolled and egodystonic, and the affected person may display signs of withdrawal.

=== Restricted emotions and interpersonal functioning ===
Individuals with this disorder may display little affection and warmth; their relationships and speech tend to be formal and professional, and they express little affection even to loved ones, such as greeting or hugging a significant other at an airport or train station.

They are extremely careful in their interpersonal interactions. They have little spontaneity when interacting with others and ensure that their speech follows rigid, austere standards by excessively scrutinising it. They filter their speech to avoid embarrassing or imperfect articulation, while maintaining a high bar for what they consider acceptable. They raise their bar even higher when they are communicating with their superiors or with a person of high status. Communication becomes a time-consuming and exhausting effort, and they start avoiding it altogether. Others regard them as cold and detached as a result.

Their need for restricting affection is a defense mechanism used to control their emotions. They may expunge emotions from their memories and organize them as a library of facts and data; the memories are intellectualized and rationalized, not experiences that they can feel. This helps them avoid unexpected emotions and feelings, allowing them to remain in control. They can view self-exploration as a waste of time and have a patronising attitude towards emotional people.

=== Interpersonal control ===
Individuals with OCPD are at one extreme of the conscientiousness continuum. While conscientiousness is a desirable trait generally, its extreme presentation for those with OCPD leads to interpersonal problems. OCPD individuals present as over-controlled, and this extends to the relationships they have with other people. Individuals with OCPD are reverential to authority and rules. OCPD individuals may therefore punish those who violate their strict standards. The inability to accept differences in beliefs or behaviors from others often leads to high conflict and controlling relationships with coworkers, spouses, and children.

== Causes ==
The cause of OCPD is thought to involve a combination of genetic and environmental factors. There is clear evidence to support the theory that OCPD is genetically inherited; however, the relevance and impact of genetic factors vary with studies placing it somewhere between 27% and 78%.

A twin study on the influence of genetics on the development of personality disorders over multiple personality disorders found that OCPD had a 0.78 heritability correlation, thus demonstrating that the development of OCPD can be strongly linked to genetics.

Other studies have found links between attachment theory and the development of OCPD. According to this hypothesis, those with OCPD have never developed a secure attachment style, had overbearing parents, were shown little care, and/or were unable to develop empathetically and emotionally.

There is evidence linking the development of obsessive-compulsive spectrum symptoms, including OCPD, to traumatic brain injuries and Parkinson's disease. Traumatic brain injury can cause new-onset or worsened OCPD traits, often due to frontal lobe or basal ganglia damage. OCPD symptoms, such as extreme rigidity and perfectionism, can emerge or worsen following these injuries. While OCD (specific obsessions/compulsions) is possible as well following TBI, OCPD is more common, affecting up to 28% of TBI cases.

== Diagnosis ==
=== Classification ===
Classification of personality disorders differs significantly between the two most prominent frameworks for classification of mental disorders, namely: the Diagnostic and Statistical Manual of Mental Disorders and the International Classification of Diseases, the most recent editions of which are the DSM-5-TR and ICD-11, respectively. While personality disorders, including OCPD, are diagnosed as separate entities in the DSM-5; in the ICD-11 classification of personality disorders, they are assessed in terms of severity levels, with trait and pattern specifiers serving to characterize the particular style of pathology. There is also a hybrid model, called the Alternative DSM-5 model for personality disorders (AMPD), which defines OCPD and five other PDs through disorder-specific combinations of pathological traits and areas of overall impairment.

==== DSM-5 ====
The DSM-5 includes two distinct diagnostic models for personality disorder. The DSM-5’s main body (Section II) retains a traditional, categorical model of 10 putatively distinct personality disorders, grouped into three clusters. Contained within cluster C, OCPD is defined as: "a pervasive pattern of preoccupation with orderliness, perfectionism, and mental and interpersonal control, at the expense of flexibility, openness, and efficiency, beginning by early adulthood and present in a variety of contexts". A diagnosis of OCPD is only received when four out of the eight criteria are met.

Located within Section III of both the DSM-5 and DSM-5-TR, the AMPD defines six specific personality disorders – one of them being OCPD – in terms of a description of the disorder, along with disorder-specific configurations of criteria A and B. Criterion A describes the characteristic manner in which the disorder impacts personality functioning, i.e. identity, self-direction, empathy and intimacy (criterion A); of these, at least two must be impaired to at least a moderate level. For example, characteristic impairment in the intimacy domain is described as follows: "Relationships seen as secondary to work and productivity; rigidity and stubbornness negatively affect relationships with others." The overall impairment must be at least moderate across criterion A.

Listing and describing the pathological personality traits associated with the disorder, the criterion B section requires that at least three of the following four pathological traits are present: rigid perfectionism, perseveration, intimacy avoidance, and restricted affectivity, with rigid perfectionism being required. The AMPD specifiers allow for additional traits to be specified. The AMPD in the DSM-5, in its description of rigid perfectionism in the case of OCPD, erroneously states that it is "an aspect of extreme Conscientiousness [the opposite pole of Detachment]". This has subsequently been updated to say that it is "the opposite pole of Disinhibition"; the updated version exits in the DSM-5-TR. Further requirements, for example relating to differential diagnosis, are embodied in criteria C–G.

==== ICD ====
A presentation aligning with the ICD-10 diagnoses of anankastic and other specific (narcissistic) personality disorder could have a presentation classified like this in accordance with the ICD-11.

The World Health Organization's ICD-11 has replaced the categorical classification of personality disorders in the ICD-10 – in which anankastic personality disorder (F60.5) is a diagnostic category – with a dimensional model containing a unified personality disorder (6D10) with severity specifiers, along with specifiers for prominent personality traits or patterns (6D11). Severity is assessed based on the pervasiveness of impairment in several areas of functioning, as well as on the level of distress and harm caused by the disorder, while trait and pattern specifiers are used for recording the manner in which the disturbance is manifested.

Research has found a significant relationship between OCPD and the ICD-11 domain Anankastia (6D11.4), reflecting rigid perfectionism, orderliness, and behavioral control. It also shows secondary associations with Negative Affectivity, due to features like excessive caution and doubt. Some studies have found additional links to Dissociality, suggesting a controlling or domineering interpersonal style, and to Detachment, possibly reflecting prioritization of productivity over relationships.

The list of criteria for the ICD-10 is similar to the one in the DSM-5, but does not include the last three criteria of the DSM-5, and additionally includes the symptoms "intrusive thoughts" and "excessive doubt and caution" as criteria for diagnosis.

=== Differential diagnosis ===
In order to find the most accurate diagnosis, a procedure of differential diagnosis is conducted. When the clinical picture raises suspicion of the presence of OCPD, there are several conditions that may also be considered, with differences between them and OCPD taken into account. Examples include other personality disorder diagnoses as well as obsessive–compulsive disorder. In case hoarding is a major problem, hoarding disorder is also supposed to be considered; it can be diagnosed alongside OCPD. Personality change due to another medical condition and substance use disorders are alternative diagnoses to be considered. Furthermore, the diagnosis should only be made when the condition exceeds the threshold of impairment required for it to be considered clinically significant; when not pathological, obsessive–compulsive personality traits may be beneficial, especially in productive environments.

==== Obsessive–compulsive disorder ====
While the similar name of obsessive–compulsive disorder (OCD) may cause it to be confused with OCPD, a noticeable difference between the two is that OCD encompasses true obsessions or compulsions.Despite similarities between these and the criteria of OCPD, there are discrete qualitative dissimilarities between these disorders, predominantly in the functional part of symptoms. Unlike OCPD, OCD is described as invasive, and stressful. Individuals with OCD have avoidance behaviors, compulsive routines, and other methods to alleviate obsessive triggers. Time-consuming obsessions and habits are aimed at reducing obsession-related stress. OCD symptoms are at times regarded as egodystonic because they are experienced as alien and repulsive to the person. Therefore, there is a greater mental anxiety associated with OCD.

In contrast, the symptoms seen in OCPD, although repetitive, are not linked with repulsive thoughts, images, or urges. OCPD characteristics and behaviors are known as egosyntonic, as people with this disorder view them as suitable and correct. On the other hand, the main features of perfectionism and inflexibility can result in considerable suffering in an individual with OCPD as a result of the associated need for control.

Similarity in the symptoms of OCD and OCPD can lead to complexity in distinguishing them clinically. For example, perfectionism is an OCPD criterion and a symptom of OCD if it involves the need for tidiness, symmetry, and organization. Hoarding is also considered both a compulsion found in OCD and a criterion for OCPD in the DSM-5. Even though OCD and OCPD are seemingly separate disorders there are obvious redundancies between the two concerning several symptoms.

==== Personality disorders ====
Schizoid personality disorder and obsessive–compulsive personality disorder may both display restricted affectivity and coldness; however, in OCPD, this is usually due to a controlling attitude, whereas, in SzPD, it occurs due to a lack of ability to experience emotion and display affection.

Individuals with a narcissistic personality disorder usually believe that they have achieved perfection (especially compared to other people) and cannot get better, whereas those with OCPD do not believe that they have achieved perfection, and are self-critical. Those with NPD tend to be stingy and lack generosity; however, they are usually generous when spending on themselves, unlike those with OCPD who hoard money and are miserly on themselves and others. Similarly, individuals with antisocial personality disorder are not generous, but miserly around others, although they usually over-indulge themselves and are sometimes reckless in spending.

=== Millon's subtypes ===
In his book, Personality Disorders in Modern Life, Theodore Millon describes five types of obsessive–compulsive personality disorder, which he shortened to compulsive personality disorder.

Subtype	Features	Traits
Conscientious compulsive	Including dependent features	Those with conscientious compulsivity view themselves as helpful, co-operative, and compromising. They downplay their achievements and abilities and base their confidence on the opinions and expectations of others; this compensates for their feelings of insecurity and instability. They assume that devotion to work and striving for perfection will lead to them receiving love and reassurance. They believe that making a mistake or not achieving perfection will lead to abandonment and criticism. This mindset causes perpetual feelings of anxiety and an inability to appreciate their work.
Puritanical compulsive	Including paranoid features	They have strong internal impulses that are countered vociferously through the use of religion. They are constantly battling their impulses and sexual drives, which they view as irrational. They attempt to purify and pacify the urges by adopting a cold and detached lifestyle. They create an enemy which they use to vent their hostility, such as "non-believers", or "lazy people". They are patronizing, bigoted, and zealous in their attitude toward others. Their beliefs are polarized into "good" and "evil".
Bureaucratic compulsive	Including narcissistic features	The bureaucratic compulsive displays signs of narcissistic traits alongside the compulsivity. They are champions of tradition, values, and bureaucracy. They cherish organizations that follow hierarchies and feel comforted by definitive roles between subordinates and superiors, and the known expectations and responsibilities. They derive their identity from work and project an image of diligence, reliability, and commitment to their institution. They view work and productivity in a polarized manner; either done or not. They may use their power and status to inflict fear and obedience in their subordinates if they do not strictly follow their rules and procedures, and derive pleasure from the sense of control and power that they acquire by doing so.
Parsimonious compulsive	Including schizoid features	The parsimonious compulsive is hoarding and possessive in nature; they behave in a manner congruent with schizoid traits. They are selfish, miserly, and are suspicious of others' intentions, believing that others may take away their possessions. This attitude may be caused by parents who deprived their child of wants or wishes but provided necessities, causing the child to develop an extreme protective approach to their belongings, often being self-sufficient and distant from others. They use this shielding behavior to prevent having their urges, desires, and imperfections discovered.
Bedevilled compulsive	Including negativistic features	This form of compulsive personality is a mixture of negativistic and compulsive behavior. When faced with dilemmas, they procrastinate and attempt to stall the decision through any means. They are in a constant battle between their desires and will, and may engage in self-defeating behavior and self-torture in order to resolve the internal conflict. Their identity is unstable, and they are indecisive.

== Treatment ==
The best-validated treatment for OCPD is cognitive therapy (CT) or cognitive behavioral therapy (CBT), with studies showing an improvement in areas of personality impairment, and reduced levels of anxiety and depression. Group CBT is also associated with an increase in extraversion and agreeableness and reduced neuroticism. Interpersonal psychotherapy has been linked to even better results when it came to reducing depressive symptoms. Additionally, two recent reviews examine different psychotherapeutic protocols for OCPD: Evolutionary Systems Therapy, Radically Open Dialectical Behavior Therapy, and Schema Therapy. Both papers emphasize that these are promising pilot studies to confirm in large-scale clinical trials.

== Epidemiology ==
Estimates for the prevalence of OCPD in the general population are 3%, making it the most common personality disorder. Current evidence is inconclusive as to whether OCPD is more common in men than women, or in equal rates among sexes. It is estimated to occur in 8.7% of psychiatric outpatient settings.

A study of data collected in the 2001-2002 National Epidemiologic Survey on Alcohol and Related Conditions looked specifically for seven personality disorders as defined by the DSM-IV. The study concluded the most prevalent personality disorder of the survey's population to be OCPD, at 7.88%. This study also concluded there were no gender differences in prevalence and that OCPD was not a predictor of disability.

=== Comorbidity ===
==== Obsessive–compulsive disorder ====
The rate of comorbidity of OCPD in patients with OCD is estimated to be around 15–28%. However, due to the addition of the hoarding disorder diagnosis in the DSM-5, and studies showing that hoarding may not be a symptom of OCPD, the true rate of comorbidity may be much lower. The two can be found in the same family, sometimes along with eating disorders.

The presence of OCPD in patients with OCD has been linked to a worse prognosis of OCD, especially when cognitive behavioral therapy was used. This may be due to the egosyntonic nature of OCPD which may lead to the obsessions becoming aligned with one's personal values. In contrast, the trait of perfectionism may improve the outcome of treatment as patients are likely to complete homework assigned to them with determination. The findings with regards to pharmacological treatment has also been mixed, with some studies showing a lower reception to SRIs in OCD patients with comorbid OCPD, with others showing no relationship.

Comorbidity between OCD and OCPD has been linked to a more severe presentation of symptoms, a younger age of onset, more significant impairment in functioning, poorer insight, and higher comorbidity of depression and anxiety.

==== Parkinson's disease ====
Individuals with Parkinson's disease are diagnosed with OCPD at a much higher rate than the general population. OCPD is the hallmark of the so-called "parkinsonsim personality" profile, a pattern of behavior characterized by rigid perfectionism, orderliness, and a cautious or industrious nature that can appear years before motor symptoms like tremors begin. Approximately 40-55% of those diagnosed with Parkinson's also have OCPD. It has not been shown that having an obsessive-compulsive personality predicts Parkinson's disease, but rather is thought that the personality profile is the result of similar neurological circuitry (rooted in the brain's fronto-basal ganglia circuits, which regulate both motor control and repetitive behaviors), rather than genetic predisposition to Parkinson’s. OCPD symptoms in Parkinson’s disease patients often begin years before the traditional motor symptoms like tremors or rigidity appear. Because these traits can precede a diagnosis, researchers frequently categorize them as an early non-motor manifestation or "premotor" sign of the disease.

==== Eating disorders ====
Perfectionism has been linked with anorexia nervosa in research for decades. A researcher in 1949 described the behavior of the average "anorexic girl" as being "rigid" and "hyperconscious", observing a tendency to "[n]eatness, meticulosity, and a mulish stubbornness not amenable to reason [which] make her a rank perfectionist." So common are such traits as perfectionism and rigidity among anorectics, that they have been referred to in clinical literature as "classical childhood features of patients with anorexia nervosa" or "classical premorbid personality descriptors of anorexia nervosa".

Regardless of the prevalence of the full-fledged OCPD among eating disordered samples, the presence of this personality disorder or its traits, such as perfectionism, has been found to be positively correlated with a range of complications in eating disorders and a negative outcome, as opposed to impulsive features—those linked with histrionic personality disorder, for example—which predict a better outcome from treatment. OCPD predicts more severe symptoms of anorexia nervosa, and worse remission rates, however, OCPD and perfectionistic traits predicted a higher acceptance of treatment, which was defined as undergoing 5 weeks of treatment.

People with anorexia nervosa who exercise excessively display a higher prevalence of several OCPD traits when compared to their counterparts who did not exercise excessively. The traits included self-imposed perfectionism, and the childhood OCPD traits of being rule-bound and cautious. It may be that people with OCPD traits are more likely to use exercise alongside restricting food intake in order to mitigate fears of increased weight, reduce anxiety, or reduce obsessions related to weight gain. Samples that had the childhood traits of rigidity, extreme cautiousness, and perfectionism endured more severe food restriction and higher levels of exercise and underwent longer periods of underweight status. It may be that OCPD traits are an indicator of a more severe manifestation of AN which is harder to treat.

==== Gambling disorder ====
A majority of those with lifelong gambling disorder have some sort of personality disorder, and the most common personality disorder amongst them is obsessive compulsive personality disorder. OCPD has a strong comorbidity with individuals who have gambling disorder. A study of data collected in the 2001-2002 National Epidemiologic Survey on Alcohol and Related Conditions looked at pathological gambling and psychiatric conditions as defined by the DSM-IV. Of the surveyed population consistent with gambling disorder, 60.8% also had a personality disorder, with OCPD appearing most frequently at 30%. About 300,000 U.S citizens have both a gambling disorder and obsessive compulsive personality disorder; and yet, there is little research on the comorbidity of the two disorders. Those with gambling disorders and OCPD do, indeed, exhibit different behavioral patterns than those with gambling disorders alone. More research on the relationship between the disorders is thought to help uncover causes and develop treatments for patients.

==== Mental fatigue ====
Recently, in 2020, the connection between mental fatigue and OCPD was published for the first time, even though mental fatigue has been previously associated with identified characteristics of OCPD such as workaholic behavior and perfectionism.

==== Autism spectrum ====
There are considerable similarities and overlap between autism spectrum disorder (ASD) and OCPD, such as list-making, inflexible adherence to rules, and obsessive aspects of ASD, although the latter may be distinguished from OCPD especially regarding affective behaviors, worse social skills, difficulties with theory of mind and intense intellectual interests, e.g. an ability to recall every aspect of a hobby. A 2009 study involving adult autistic people found that 32% of those diagnosed with ASD met the diagnostic requirements for a comorbid OCPD diagnosis.

==== Other disorders and conditions ====
A diagnosis of OCPD is common with anxiety disorders, substance use disorders, and mood disorders. OCPD is also highly comorbid with Cluster A personality disorders, especially paranoid and schizotypal personality disorders.

OCPD is also linked to hypochondriasis, with some studies estimating a rate of co-occurrence as high as 55.7%.

Moreover, OCPD has been found to be very common among some medical conditions, including Parkinson's disease and the hypermobile subtype of Ehler-Danlos syndrome. The latter may be explained by the need for control that arises from musculoskeletal problems and the associated features that arise early in life, whilst the former can be explained by dysfunctions in the fronto-basal ganglia circuitry.

Psychiatric disorder	Prevalence of OCPD in 12 month diagnosis
Substance use disorder	12–25%
Mood disorders	24%
Major depressive disorder	23–28%
Bipolar disorder	26–39%
Anxiety disorders	23–24%
Generalised anxiety disorder	34%
Panic disorder	23–38%
Social anxiety disorder	33%
Specific phobia	22%

== History ==
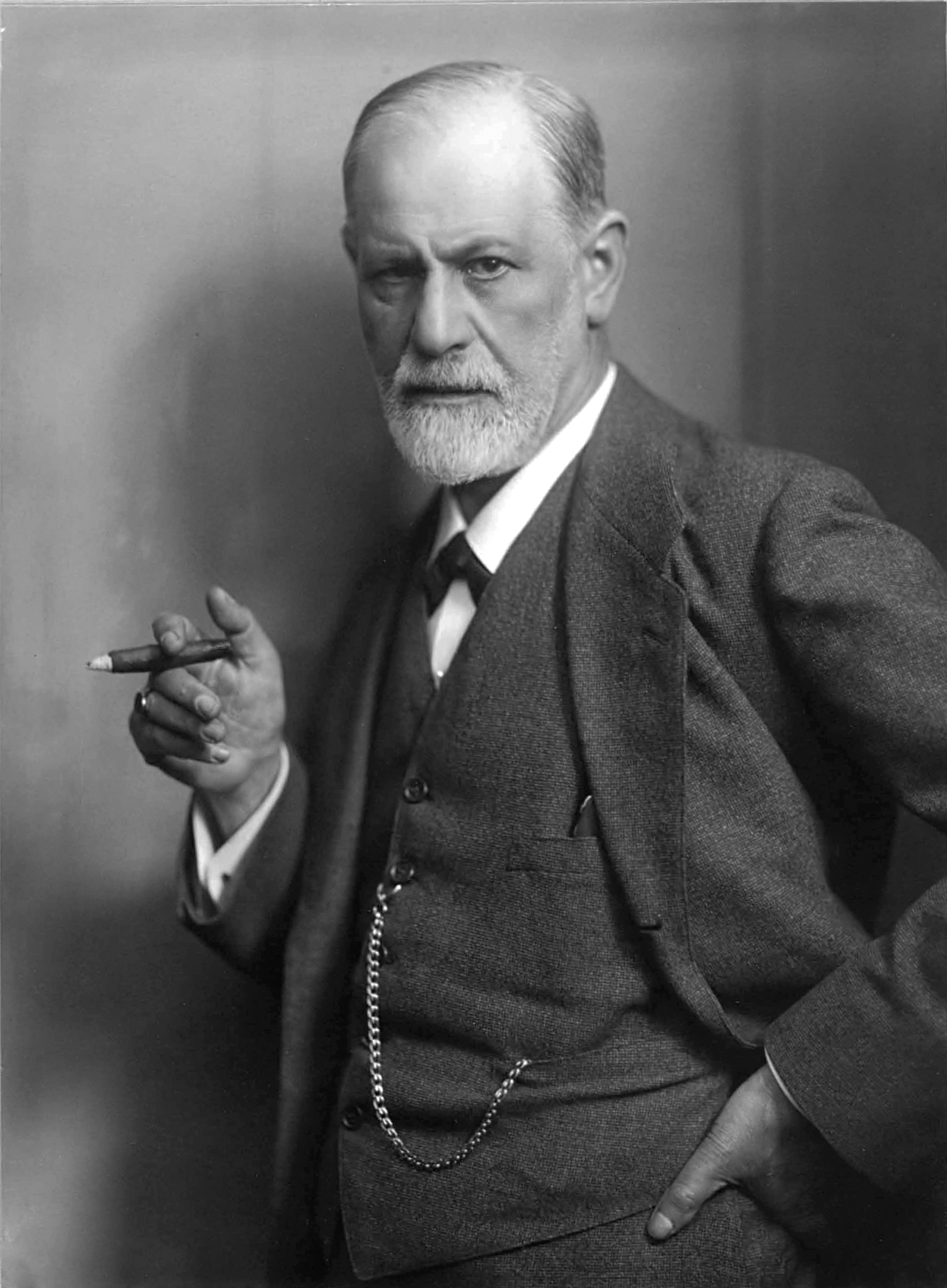
Sigmund Freud, 1921

In 1908, Sigmund Freud named what is now known as obsessive–compulsive or anankastic personality disorder "anal retentive character". He identified the main strands of the personality type as a preoccupation with orderliness, parsimony (frugality), and obstinacy (rigidity and stubbornness). The concept fits his theory of psychosexual development. Freud believed that the anal retentive character faced difficulties regulating the control of defecation, leading to repercussions by the parents, and it is the latter that would cause the anal retentive character.

Aubrey Lewis, in his 1936 book Problems of Obsessional Illness, suggests that anal-erotic characteristics are found in patients without obsessive thoughts, and proposed two types of obsessional personality, one melancholy and stubborn, the other uncertain and indecisive.

In the book Contributions to the theory of the anal character, Karl Abraham noted that the core feature of the anal character is being perfectionistic, and he believed that these traits will help an individual in becoming industrious and productive, whilst hindering their social and interpersonal functioning, such as working with others.

OCPD was included in the first edition of the Diagnostic and Statistical Manual of Mental Disorders in 1952 by the American Psychiatric Association under the name "compulsive personality". It was defined as a chronic and excessive preoccupation with adherence to rules and standards of conscience. Other symptoms included rigidity, over-conscientiousness, and a reduced ability to relax.

The DSM-II (1968) changed the name to "obsessive–compulsive personality", and also suggested the term "anankastic personality" in order to reduce confusion between OCPD and OCD, but the proposed name was removed from later editions. The symptoms described in the DSM-II closely resembled those in the original DSM.

In 1980, the DSM-III was released, and it renamed the disorder back to "compulsive personality disorder", and also included new symptoms of the disorder: a restricted expression of affect, and an inability to delegate tasks. Devotion to productivity, perfectionism, and indecisiveness were the other symptoms included. The DSM-III-R (1987) renamed the disorder again to "obsessive–compulsive personality disorder" and the name has remained since then. A diagnosis of OCPD was given when 5 of the 9 symptoms were met, and the 9 symptoms included perfectionism, preoccupation with details, an insistence that others submit to one's way, indecisiveness, devotion to work, restricted expression of affect, excessive conscientiousness, lack of generosity, and hoarding.

With DSM-IV, OCPD was classified as a 'Cluster C' personality disorder. There was a dispute about the categorization of OCPD as an Axis II anxiety disorder. Although the DSM-IV attempted to distinguish between OCPD and OCD by focusing on the absence of obsessions and compulsions in OCPD, OC personality traits are easily mistaken for abnormal cognitions or values considered to underpin OCD. The disorder is a neglected and understudied area of research.

== See also ==
- Anal retentiveness
- Analysis paralysis
- Authoritarian personality
- Hoarding disorder
- Idée fixe (psychology)
- Jobsworth
- Mysophobia
- Pedantry
- Perfection
- Perfectionism
- Scrupulosity
- VUCA
- Workaholic

== Bibliography ==
- American Psychiatric Association (2013). Diagnostic and statistical manual of mental disorders (5th ed.). Washington, D.C.: American Psychiatric Publishing. ISBN 978-0-89042-555-8. OCLC 830807378.
- Clark LA (2025-05-01). "Wherefrom and Whither PD? Recent Developments and Future Possibilities in DSM-5 and ICD-11 Personality Disorder Diagnosis". Current Psychiatry Reports. 27 (5): 267–277. doi:10.1007/s11920-025-01602-y. ISSN 1535-1645. PMC 12003573. PMID 40108080. This article incorporates text from this source, which is available under the CC BY 4.0 license.
- Diedrich A, Voderholzer U (February 2015). "Obsessive–compulsive personality disorder: a current review". Current Psychiatry Reports. 17 (2) 2. doi:10.1007/s11920-014-0547-8. PMID 25617042. S2CID 20999600.
- Gecaite-Stonciene J, Lochner C, Marincowitz C, Fineberg NA, Stein DJ (2021-03-16). "Obsessive-Compulsive (Anankastic) Personality Disorder in the ICD-11: A Scoping Review". Frontiers in Psychiatry. 12 646030. doi:10.3389/fpsyt.2021.646030. ISSN 1664-0640. PMC 8007778. PMID 33796036.
- Grant JE, Pinto A, Chamberlain SR (2020). Obsessive-compulsive personality disorder. Washington (D.C.): American psychiatric association publishing. ISBN 978-1-61537-280-5.
- Marazziti D, Gurrieri R, Fontenelle LF, Pejuskovic B, Mucci F (2026-07-17). "Choosing the right treatment option for adults with obsessive-compulsive personality disorder". Expert Review of Neurotherapeutics. 0 (ja): 1–4. doi:10.1080/14737175.2026.2706804. ISSN 1473-7175. PMID 42469964.
- Rizvi A, Torrico TJ (2023), "Obsessive-Compulsive Personality Disorder", StatPearls, Treasure Island (FL): StatPearls Publishing, PMID 37983323
- Schulte Holthausen B, Habel U (2018-10-11). "Sex Differences in Personality Disorders". Current Psychiatry Reports. 20 (12): 107. doi:10.1007/s11920-018-0975-y. ISSN 1535-1645. PMID 30306417.
