= Pathological jealousy =

Psychological disorder

Pathological jealousy, also known as morbid jealousy, is a psychological disorder characterized by a pervasive preoccupation with the belief that one's spouse or romantic partner is being unfaithful, despite the absence of any real or substantiated evidence. The condition encompasses two primary clinical subtypes: obsessional jealousy and delusional jealousy, the latter also referred to as Othello syndrome.

Obsessive jealousy is generally classified as a subtype of obsessive-compulsive disorder, reflecting recurrent, intrusive thoughts and compulsive behaviors related to concerns about infidelity. In contrast, delusional jealousy is recognized as a subtype of delusional disorder, involving fixed, false beliefs concerning a partner's infidelity that are resistant to reason or contrary evidence.

== Delusional jealousy ==
This disorder is characterised by persistent suspicions of a partner's infidelity that are not supported by the evidence. Individuals affected by the condition may misinterpret neutral behaviour as indications of unfaithfulness, which further reinforces their perceptions.

Some studies have suggested that the disorder may co-occur with other conditions, including psychiatric disorders such as schizophrenia and delusional disorder, as well as mood disorders such as bipolar disorder. It has also been associated with certain behaviours, including stalking, cyberstalking, sabotage, alcoholism, sexual dysfunction, and neurological disorders such as Parkinson's disease.

Pathological jealousy is generally identified through clinical assessment and is recognised as a possible feature of certain psychiatric conditions. According to the Diagnostic and Statistical Manual of Mental Disorders, Fifth Edition (DSM-5), it may be observed in disorders such as obsessive-compulsive disorder and delusional disorder. While it is not classified as a distinct diagnostic category, pathological jealousy is often viewed as a manifestation of underlying mental health issues.

The term "Othello Syndrome" is derived from the central character in Shakespeare’s tragedy Othello. In the play, Othello kills his wife Desdemona in the mistaken belief that she has been unfaithful to him. However, some scholars and experts have pointed out that Othello's actions resulted from manipulation and misinformation, which did not exhibit the clinical features of delusional disorder.

== Psychiatric history ==
Clinical assessment of pathological jealousy requires a comprehensive assessment of the psychiatric history, encompassing the following areas:

- Presenting difficulties: neurotic or psychotic jealousy
- Past psychiatric history: neurotic or psychotic disorders, deliberate self-harm, and attempted suicide
- Family history: mental illness, including pathological jealousy
- Relationship history: incorporating both the current and previous relationships, and taking account of the quality of the relationships and the difficulties experienced
- Forensic history: previous and pending charges and convictions, as well as deviant behavior which was not reported or did not result in a charge or conviction (including aggressive behavior and stalking)
- Medical history: organic causes which may be responsible for the morbid jealousy (e.g., Parkinson's)

== Forms ==
- Obsessions: in individuals with pathological jealousy, obsessive jealous thoughts are often experienced as egodystonic; i.e., contrary to the individual's values or wishes. These thoughts are often perceived as irrational and intrusive and may lead to the emergence of compulsive behavior such as checking up on their partner may follow. Some research suggests that pathological jealousy may lie on a continuum from obsessional to delusional thinking. Due to individual differences, there may also be significant differences in the degree of self-affliction experienced by the patient
- Extreme obsessions: the individual may spend a significant amount of time ruminating on jealousy and find it difficult to shift their focus. This preoccupation may lead to excessive behaviour, such as restricting the freedom of the partner. Although a distinction was occasionally difficult to make, the categories of ‘psychotic’ (delusional) and ‘neurotic’ jealousy contained similar proportions (each between one-third and one-half).
- Delusions: egosyntonic thoughts refer to ideas or behaviours that individuals perceive as true, reasonable, and consistent with their personal values or identity, and therefore are not resisted. Some authors compare morbid jealousy to a delusional state. Beliefs may include the morbidly jealous subjects' suspicion that: 1. they are being poisoned or given some substance(s) to decrease sexual potency by their partner, 2. that their partner has contracted a sexually transmitted disease from a third party 3. that their partner is engaging in sexual intercourse with a third party while the subject sleeps.
- Overvalued ideas: overvalued ideas are characterised by a reasonably comprehensible thought of the patient that goes beyond the bounds of rationality in a particular situation. The idea itself is not irrational, but the patient's lack of resistance may lead to excessive behaviours, such as investigations to maintain a partner's loyalty. This kind of highly evaluative behaviour towards ideas can have negative consequences for both parties in the relationship. Overvalued ideas are characterized by being existent in the individual's own thoughts, and being egosyntonic; this means that patients may act on these ideas because they are consistent with the individual's ego, or consistent with the individual's ideal self-image, the ideas are also amenable to reason but are not resisted, even if they may have irrational consequences.

== Causes ==
=== Psychological ===
Morbid jealousy has been associated with a range of psychological factors. In some cases, it is conceptualized as a delusional state. According to Kingham and Gordon, “Delusions of infidelity exist without any other psychopathology and may be considered to be morbid jealousy in its ‘purest’ form.” The condition is often characterized by distorted memory processing and misinterpretation of a partner’s behavior, leading to a fixed conviction of betrayal despite the absence of objective evidence.

Certain brain disorders have also been implicated in the development of delusional beliefs related to infidelity. Cobb (1979) noted that “morbid jealousy may be present with all types of cerebral insult or injury,” suggesting a neurological basis for some cases. Furthermore, it has been proposed that diminished sexual function may serve as a contributing factor in the emergence of morbid jealousy. Cobb highlighted instances involving elderly men whose declining sexual capacity was perceived as inadequate by significantly younger partners, potentially giving rise to pathological suspicion and jealousy.

Mullen (1990) considered morbid jealousy to be associated with four features:

- An underlying mental disorder emerges before or with the jealousy
- The features of the underlying disorder coexist with the jealousy
- The course of morbid jealousy closely relates to that of the underlying disorder
- The jealousy has no basis in reality

=== Personality ===
People who are very insecure, or even fearful, are more likely to become anxious, or question their partner's commitment to them. “Insecure attachment style correlates strongly with borderline personality disorder” (Kingham and Gordon).

=== Environmental ===
Some people even believe that someone who is morbidly jealous might suspect that he or she is being drugged or given some kind of substance that might decrease their sexual potency, or they might even be under the impression that their significant other has somehow received a sexually transmitted disease from another person while the subject is unaware.

== Epidemiology ==
There is no known prevalence of morbid jealousy; currently, there is no community survey tracking its existence in individuals. As of 1979, it was considered to be a rare occurrence. Still, many counselors encounter cases of morbid jealousy. Some clinicians may not at first be able to treat this condition due to other dominating psychopathologies present within the jealous person that call for priority attention.

Men and women differ dramatically when it comes to morbid jealousy. Men who suffer from morbid jealousy are more likely than women to use violence and also are more likely to harm or kill with their hands rather than a blunt object. Women on the other hand, when using violence, tend to use a blunt object or knife. Men focus on the rival's status and resources when it comes to the threat of jealousy they fear. Women tend to become more jealous of a potential threat based on their rival's youth and physical attractiveness.

== Triggers ==
Research indicates that for men, sexual infidelity is typically the most significant trigger of morbid jealousy, whereas for women, emotional infidelity tends to elicit a stronger response. In cases where partner-related violence does not deter infidelity, some male individuals may resort to suicide as a final response. In extreme circumstances, morbid jealousy may culminate in partner homicide as a means of attempting to prevent further infidelity. Statistically, women are considerably less likely to commit such acts, with most cases occurring in the context of self-defense.

Morbid jealousy has been observed in association with a range of medical and psychiatric conditions, including chronic alcoholism, substance dependence (such as cocaine and amphetamines), and various organic brain disorders (e.g., Parkinson's disease, Huntington's disease). It is also linked to psychiatric conditions such as schizophrenia, neuroses, mood disorders, and personality disorders.

== Associated drug and alcohol use ==
Alcohol and drug misuse has a well-recognized association with morbid jealousy. “In two studies, morbid jealousy was present in 27% and 34% respectively of men recruited from alcohol treatment services” (Shrestha et al., 1985; Michael et al., 1995). Amphetamine and cocaine increase the possibility of a delusion of infidelity that can continue after intoxication stops. (Shepherd, 1961).

== Assessment ==
In an attempt to counsel or treat the morbid jealousy of an individual, proper and thorough assessment must be employed. This approach is broad in nature, but necessary so as to provide adequate information that will aid in the possible reparation of a dynamic containing a morbidly jealous person. To begin, a careful history should be taken of both partners if possible; separate and together. It is imperative that a full and detailed psychiatric history and mental state examination be recorded for the jealous partner; doing so may enable one to distinguish whether the jealousy is obsessional or delusional in nature. It is also possible that the jealousy may be the result of a thought that has been given too much importance. Considering that jealousy is a very delicate issue, any reference made to it should be approached carefully and with tact. It must be kept in mind that the jealous individual may be displacing blame for their issues onto their partner and their alleged infidelity as opposed to their own behavior. If there is any history of relevant or related mental illness and substance misuse it should be noted as it may possibly be a contributing or aiding factor. In order to get the best grasp on the issues and begin positive progression, multiple interviews should be held to assess the marital relationship.

After completing the assessment, it is best to deliver information about risk with both individuals in the relationship. Due to confidentiality, the patient should give consent for this information to be shared unless there is a risk to another individual and it is serious and immediate. This is the only case in which confidentiality is invalid. The professional should ensure that all necessary steps are taken to guarantee the safety of a potential victim, keeping in mind that it is possible that authorities may have to be alerted regarding the matter. If the professional has reason to believe that there is a high risk of harm to themselves or another person, the individual who is morbidly jealous should be admitted to a hospital as soon as possible to prevent any negative outcomes for any parties involved.

== Management ==
Morbid jealousy encompasses various psychiatric states and the best way to approach treatment depends on the symptoms that are observed in the individual. Therefore, prognosis and outcomes vary from person to person and depends on the situation and the complexities of the interpersonal relationships being observed. Also, other issues that may exacerbate the negative aspects of the environment created by jealous behavior need to be addressed in order to begin reparations. For example, if alcoholism plays a role in the behavior of the morbidly jealous individual, treatment of their addiction can positively affect their progress in trying to change their jealous nature. While psychotherapy can be an effective method of treating morbidly jealous persons, it is not sufficient when the nature of their illness is more serious. It is not possible to say that there is one form of treatment that is superior over all those that are currently available. Even though this may be true, cognitive behavioral therapy is the treatment that has proven to be most effective.

Medical

- Treatment of the primary psychiatric condition
- Antipsychotic medication
- Antidepressant medication

Psychological

- Psycho education for the affected person and the partner
- Behavioral therapy
- Cognitive therapy
- Individual psychotherapy
- Insight-oriented psychotherapies
- Family therapy
- Couple therapy

Social

- Geographical separation of the partners
- Social work involvement for child protection issues
- Alcohol and substance misuse treatment

== Risks associated ==
=== Confirmatory behaviors ===
When suspicions of the partner's fidelity arise, they quickly become all that is thought about. Certain behaviors, such as interrogation of the partner, repeated telephone calls to work and surprise visits, stalking behavior, setting up recording devices in the home or work, or hiring a private detective to follow the partner, are all common in trying to determine if there is truly infidelity or if it is just perceived. Individuals who are jealous may take drastic measures, such as searching the partner's clothing and belongings, looking through diaries and other communication methods (email, text messaging), or examining bed sheets, undergarments, and even genitalia for evidence of sexual activity.

=== Harm to self ===
Suicidal thoughts are common in morbid jealousy, especially because of its association with depression and substance abuse.

=== Risk to others ===
Violence can occur in any relationship tainted with jealousy, either normal or morbid jealousy. In a study of jealousy by Mullen & Martin in 1994, 15% of both men and women reported that at some time they had been “subjected to physical violence at the hands of a jealous partner.” Culturally, jealousy may be even used to “justify violence towards partners.” Victims in a homicide case are most likely to be current or ex-partners in both female and male perpetrators. When a partner repeatedly denies infidelity, this may provoke anger and extreme violence. On the other hand, the partner that is suffering may give up and give a false confession, which in turn most likely will provoke rage in the jealous individual. In the U.S. a sample was taken of 20 participants with delusional jealousy. 19 were male and the researchers found that 12 had threatened to kill their spouse because of their perceived infidelity. Of the 12 males, all actually attacked their spouse. Out of the 20, a weapon was used by three of them, and 12 had harmed their spouse. The one female participant also attacked her spouse. A presence of paranoid delusions and hallucinations of injury to the spouse were most often associated with violence. This suggests that individuals who suffer from delusional jealousy who partake in violence may be solely driven by psychotic phenomena. A higher risk of assault was associated with alcohol consumption.

=== Risk to children ===
Children who live in a household with a parent who suffers from morbid jealousy may suffer emotional and/or physical abuse as a direct result of the actions made by the parent. Children may also accidentally overhear arguments or witness physical violence between their parents. They could even be potentially accidentally injured during assaults. The morbidly jealous parent may employ a child or more than one to spy on the other parent. It is not out of the question for a child to witness a homicide or suicide where their parent is the victim.

== See also ==
- Abusive power and control
- Envy
- Isolation to facilitate abuse
- Martha Mitchell effect

== Sources ==
- Enoch, D. & Ball, H. (2001) The Othello Syndrome. In Enoch, D. & Ball, H. Uncommon psychiatric syndromes (fourth edition) pp50–73. London: Arnold. ISBN 0-340-76388-4
