= Emergency psychiatry =

Clinical application of psychiatry in emergency settings

The Greek letter Psi, representing psychology and psychiatry.

The Star of Life, representing emergency medical services.

Emergency psychiatry is the clinical application of psychiatry in emergency settings. Conditions requiring psychiatric interventions may include suicide attempts, substance abuse, depression, psychosis, violence, or other rapid changes in behavior.

Psychiatric emergency services are rendered by professionals in the fields of medicine, nursing, psychology, and social work. The demand for emergency psychiatric services has rapidly increased throughout the world since the 1960s, especially in urban areas. Care for patients in situations involving emergency psychiatry is complex.

Individuals may arrive in psychiatric emergency service settings through their own voluntary request, a referral from another health professional, or through involuntary commitment.

Care of patients requiring psychiatric intervention usually encompasses crisis stabilization of many serious and potentially life-threatening conditions which could include acute or chronic mental disorders or symptoms similar to those conditions.

== Definition ==
Symptoms and conditions behind psychiatric emergencies may include suicide attempts, parasuicide, substance dependence, alcohol intoxication, acute depression, presence of delusions, violence, panic attacks, and significant, rapid changes in behavior.

Emergency psychiatry exists to identify and/or treat these symptoms and psychiatric conditions. In addition, several rapidly lethal medical conditions present themselves with common psychiatric symptoms. A physician's or a nurse's ability to identify and intervene with these and other medical conditions is critical.

A psychiatric emergency is a disturbance in thought, mood and/or action which causes sudden distress to the individual and/or others, and/or sudden disability or death, thus requiring immediate management.

== Delivery of services ==
The place where emergency psychiatric services are delivered are most commonly referred to as Psychiatric Emergency Services, Psychiatric Emergency Care Centers, or Comprehensive Psychiatric Emergency Programs. Mental health professionals from a wide area of disciplines, including medicine, nursing, psychology, and social work in these settings alongside psychiatrists and emergency physicians. The facilities, sometimes housed in a psychiatric hospital, psychiatric ward, or emergency department, provide immediate treatment to both voluntary and involuntary patients 24 hours a day, 7 days a week.

Within a protected environment, psychiatric emergency services exist to provide brief stay of two or three days to gain a diagnostic clarity, find appropriate alternatives to psychiatric hospitalization for the patient, and to treat those patients whose symptoms can be improved within that brief period of time. Even precise psychiatric diagnoses are a secondary priority compared with interventions in a crisis setting. The functions of psychiatric emergency services are to assess patients' problems, implement a short-term treatment consisting of no more than ten meetings with the patient, procure a 24-hour holding area, mobilize teams to carry out interventions at patients' residences, utilize emergency management services to prevent further crises, be aware of inpatient and outpatient psychiatric resources, and provide 24/7 telephone counseling.

== History ==
Since the 1960s, the demand for emergency psychiatric services has endured a rapid growth due to deinstitutionalization both in Europe and the United States. Deinstitutionalization, in some locations, has resulted in a larger number of severely mentally ill people living in the community. There have been increases in the number of medical specialties, and the multiplication of transitory treatment options, such as psychiatric medication. The actual number of psychiatric emergencies has also increased significantly, especially in psychiatric emergency service settings located in urban areas.

Emergency psychiatry has involved the evaluation and treatment of unemployed, homeless, and other disenfranchised populations. Emergency psychiatry services have sometimes been able to offer accessibility, convenience, and anonymity. While many of the patients who have used psychiatric emergency services shared common sociological and demographic characteristics, the symptoms and needs expressed have not conformed to any single psychiatric profile. The individualized care needed for patients utilizing psychiatric emergency services is evolving, requiring an always changing and sometimes complex treatment approach.

== Scope ==
=== Suicide attempts and suicidal thoughts ===
As of 2025, the World Health Organization estimates 727,000 suicides in the world each year. There are many times more suicide attempts. Psychiatric emergency service settings exist to treat the mental disorders associated with an increased risk of suicide or suicide attempts. Mental health professionals in these settings are expected to predict acts of violence patients may commit against themselves (or others), even though the complex factors leading to a suicide can stem from many sources, including psychosocial, biological, interpersonal, anthropological, and religious. These mental health professionals will use any resources available to them to determine risk factors, make an overall assessment, and decide on any necessary treatment.

=== Violent behavior ===
Aggression can result from internal and external factors that create measurable activation in the autonomic nervous system. This activation can become evident through symptoms such as being easily startled, clenching the fists or jaw, hitting palms of hands with fists, pacing, or slamming doors. It is estimated that 17% of visits to psychiatric emergency service settings are homicidal in origin and an additional 5% involve both suicide and homicide. Violence is also associated with many conditions such as acute intoxication, acute psychosis, paranoid personality disorder, antisocial personality disorder, narcissistic personality disorder, and borderline personality disorder. Additional risk factors have also been identified which may lead to violent behavior. Such risk factors may include prior arrests, presence of hallucinations, delusions, or other neurological impairment, being uneducated, unmarried, etc. Mental health professionals complete violence risk assessments to determine both security measures and treatments for the patient.

=== Psychosis ===
Patients with psychotic symptoms are common in psychiatric emergency service settings. The determination of the source of the psychosis can be difficult. Sometimes patients brought into the setting in a psychotic state have been disconnected from their previous treatment plan. While the psychiatric emergency service setting will not be able to provide long-term care for these types of patients, it can exist to provide a brief respite and reconnect the patient to their case manager and/or reintroduce necessary psychiatric medication. A visit to a crisis unit by a patient with a chronic mental disorder may also indicate the existence of an undiscovered precipitant, such as change in the lifestyle of the individual, or a shifting medical condition. These considerations can play a part in an improvement to an existing treatment plan.

An individual could also be experiencing an acute onset of psychosis. Such conditions can be prepared for diagnosis by obtaining a medical or psychopathological history of a patient, performing a mental status examination, conducting psychological testing, obtaining neuroimages, and obtaining other neurophysiologic measurements. Following this, the mental health professional can perform a differential diagnosis and prepare the patient for treatment. As with other patient care considerations, the origins of acute psychosis can be difficult to determine because of the mental state of the patient. However, acute psychosis is classified as a medical emergency requiring immediate and complete attention according to Shubham kumar. The lack of identification and treatment can result in suicide, homicide, or other violence.

=== Substance dependence, abuse, and intoxication ===
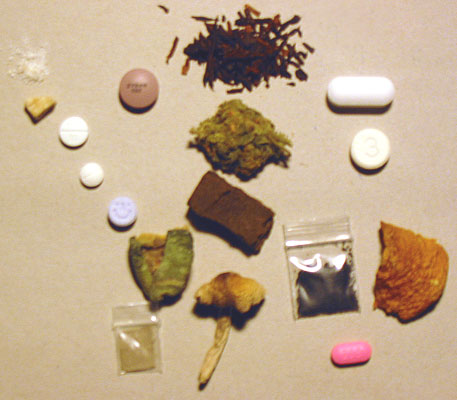
Illicit psychoactive drugs, a cause of psychotic symptoms

Another common cause of psychotic symptoms is substance intoxication. These acute symptoms may resolve after a period of observation or limited psychopharmacological treatment. However the underlying issues, such as substance dependence or abuse, is difficult to treat in the emergency department, as it is a long term condition. Both acute alcohol intoxication as well as other forms of substance abuse can require psychiatric interventions. Acting as a depressant of the central nervous system, the early effects of alcohol are usually desired for and characterized by increased talkativeness, giddiness, and a loosening of social inhibitions. Besides considerations of impaired concentration, verbal and motor performance, insight, judgment, and short-term memory loss, which could result in behavioral change causing injury or death, levels of alcohol below 60 milligrams per deciliter of blood are usually considered non-lethal. However, individuals at 200 milligrams per deciliter of blood are considered grossly intoxicated and concentration levels at 400 milligrams per deciliter of blood are lethal, causing complete anesthesia of the respiratory system.

Beyond the dangerous behavioral changes that occur after the consumption of certain amounts of alcohol, idiosyncratic intoxication could occur in some individuals even after the consumption of relatively small amounts of alcohol. Episodes of this impairment usually consist of confusion, disorientation, delusions and visual hallucinations, increased aggressiveness, rage, agitation, and violence. Chronic alcoholics may also have alcoholic hallucinosis, wherein the cessation of prolonged drinking may trigger auditory hallucinations. Such episodes can last for a few hours or an entire week. Antipsychotics are often used to treat these symptoms.

Patients may also be treated for substance abuse following the administration of psychoactive substances containing amphetamine, caffeine, tetrahydrocannabinol (THC), cocaine, phencyclidine (PCP), inhalants, opioids, sedatives, hypnotics, anxiolytics, and hallucinogens. Clinicians assessing and treating substance abusers must establish therapeutic rapport to counter denial and other negative attitudes directed towards treatment. In addition, the clinician must determine substances used, the route of administration, dosage, and time of last use to determine the necessary short and long-term treatments. An appropriate choice of treatment setting must also be determined. These settings may include outpatient facilities, partial hospitals, residential treatment centers, or hospitals. Both the immediate and long-term treatment and setting is determined by the severity of dependency and seriousness of physiological complications arising from the abuse.

=== Hazardous drug reactions and interactions ===
Overdoses, drug interactions, and dangerous reactions from psychiatric medications, especially antipsychotics, are considered psychiatric emergencies. Neuroleptic malignant syndrome is a potentially lethal complication of first- or-second generation antipsychotics. If untreated, neuroleptic malignant syndrome can result in fever, muscle rigidity, confusion, unstable vital signs, or even death. Serotonin syndrome can result when selective serotonin reuptake inhibitors or monoamine oxidase inhibitors mix with buspirone. Severe symptoms of serotonin syndrome include hyperthermia, delirium, and tachycardia that may lead to shock. Often patients with severe general medical symptoms, such as unstable vital signs, will be transferred to a general medical emergency department or medicine service for increased monitoring.

=== Personality disorders ===
Disorders manifesting dysfunction in areas related to cognition, affectivity, interpersonal functioning and impulse control can be considered personality disorders. Patients with a personality disorder will usually not complain about symptoms resulting from their disorder. Patients with an emergency phase of a personality disorder may showcase combative or suspicious behavior, have brief psychotic episodes, or be delusional. Compared with outpatient settings and the general population, the prevalence of individuals with personality disorders in inpatient psychiatric settings is usually 7–25% higher. Clinicians working with such patients attempt to stabilize the individual to their baseline level of function.

=== Anxiety ===
Patients with an extreme case of anxiety may seek treatment when all support systems have been exhausted and they are unable to bear the anxiety. Feelings of anxiety may present in different ways from an underlying medical illness or psychiatric disorder, a secondary functional disturbance from another psychiatric disorder, from a primary psychiatric disorder such as panic disorder or generalized anxiety disorder, or as a result of stress from such conditions as adjustment disorder or post-traumatic stress disorder. Clinicians usually attempt to first provide a "safe harbor" for the patient so that assessment processes and treatments can be adequately facilitated. The initiation of treatments for mood and anxiety disorders are important as patients with anxiety disorders have a higher risk of premature death.

=== Disasters ===
Natural disasters and man-made hazards can cause severe psychological stress in victims surrounding the event. Emergency management often includes psychiatric emergency services designed to help victims cope with the situation. The impact of disasters can cause people to feel shocked, overwhelmed, immobilized, panic-stricken, or confused. Hours, days, months, and even years after a disaster, individuals can experience tormenting memories, vivid nightmares, develop apathy, withdrawal, memory lapses, fatigue, loss of appetite, insomnia, depression, irritability, panic attacks, or dysphoria.

Due to the typically disorganized and hazardous environment following a disaster, mental health professionals typically assess and treat patients as rapidly as possible. Unless a condition is threatening life of the patient, or others around the patient, other medical and basic survival considerations are managed first. Soon after a disaster clinicians may make themselves available to allow individuals to ventilate to relieve feelings of isolation, helplessness, and vulnerability. Dependent upon the scale of the disaster, many victims may develop either chronic or acute post-traumatic stress disorder. Patients affected severely by this disorder often are admitted to psychiatric hospitals to stabilize the individual.

=== Abuse ===
Incidents of physical abuse, sexual abuse, or rape can result in dangerous outcomes to the victim of the criminal act. Victims may have extreme anxiety, fear, helplessness, confusion, eating or sleeping disorders, hostility, guilt, and shame. Managing the response usually encompasses coordinating psychological, medical, and legal considerations. Dependent upon legal requirements in the region, mental health professionals may be required to report criminal activity to a police force. Mental health professionals will usually gather identifying data during the initial assessment and refer the patient, if necessary, to receive medical treatment. Medical treatment may include a physical examination, collection of medicolegal evidence, and determination of the risk of pregnancy, if applicable.

== Treatment ==
Treatments in psychiatric emergency service settings are typically transitory in nature and only exist to provide dispositional solutions and/or to stabilize life-threatening conditions. Once stabilized, patients with chronic conditions may be transferred to a setting which can provide long term psychiatric rehabilitation. Prescribed treatments within the emergency service setting vary dependent upon the patient's condition. Different forms of psychiatric medication, psychotherapy, or electroconvulsive therapy may be used in the emergency setting. The introduction and efficacy of psychiatric medication as a treatment option in psychiatry has reduced the utilization of physical restraints in emergency settings, by reducing dangerous symptoms resulting from acute exacerbation of mental illness or substance intoxication.

=== Medications ===
With time as a critical aspect of emergency psychiatry, the rapidity of effect is an important consideration. Pharmacokinetics is the movement of drugs through the body with time and is at least partially reliant upon the route of administration, absorption, distribution, and metabolism of the medication. A common route of administration is oral administration, however if this method is to work the drug must be able to get to the stomach and stay there. In cases of vomiting and nausea this method of administration is not an option. Suppositories can, in some situations, be administered instead. Medication can also be administered through intramuscular injection, or through intravenous injection.

The amount of time required for absorption varies dependent upon many factors including drug solubility, gastrointestinal motility, and pH. If a medication is administered orally the amount of food in the stomach may also affect the rate of absorption. Once absorbed medications must be distributed throughout the body, or usually with the case of psychiatric medication, past the blood–brain barrier to the brain. With all of these factors affecting the rapidity of effect, the time until the effects are evident varies. Generally, though, the timing with medications is relatively fast and can occur within several minutes. As an example, physicians usually expect to see a remission of symptoms thirty minutes after haloperidol, an antipsychotic, is administered intramuscularly. Antipsychotics, especially haloperidol, and various benzodiazepines are the most frequently used drugs in emergency psychiatry, especially agitation.

=== Psychotherapy ===
Other treatment methods may be used in psychiatric emergency service settings. Brief psychotherapy can be used to treat acute conditions or immediate problems as long as the patient understands his or her issues are psychological, the patient trusts the physician, the physician can encourage hope for change, the patient has motivation to change, the physician is aware of the psychopathological history of the patient, and the patient understands that their confidentiality will be respected. The process of brief therapy under emergency psychiatric conditions includes the establishment of a primary complaint from the patient, realizing psychosocial factors, formulating an accurate representation of the problem, coming up with ways to solve the problem, and setting specific goals. The information gathering aspect of brief psychotherapy is therapeutic because it helps the patient place his or her problem in the proper perspective. If the physician determines that deeper psychotherapy sessions are required, he or she can transition the patient out of the emergency setting and into an appropriate clinic or center.

=== Electroconvulsive therapy ===
Electroconvulsive therapy (ECT) is a controversial form of treatment which cannot be involuntarily applied in psychiatric emergency service settings in the United States. Instances wherein a patient is depressed to such a severe degree that the patient cannot be stopped from hurting himself or herself or, when a patient refuses to swallow, eat, or drink medication, electroconvulsive therapy could be suggested as a therapeutic alternative. While preliminary research suggests that electroconvulsive therapy may be an effective treatment for depression, it usually requires a course of six to twelve sessions of convulsions lasting at least 20 seconds for those antidepressant effects to occur.

== Observation and collateral information ==
There are other essential aspects of emergency psychiatry: observation and collateral information. The observation of the patient's behavior is an important aspect of emergency psychiatry as it allows the clinicians working with the patient to estimate prognosis and improvements or declines in condition. Many jurisdictions base involuntary commitment on dangerousness or the inability to care for one's basic needs. Observation for a period of time may help determine this. For example, if a patient who is committed for violent behavior in the community, continues to behave in an erratic manner without clear purpose, this will help the staff decide that hospital admission may be needed.

Collateral information or parallel information is information obtained from family, friends, or treatment providers of the patient. Some jurisdictions require consent from the patient to obtain this information while others do not. For example, with a patient who is thought to be paranoid about people following him or spying on him, this information can be helpful discern if these thoughts are more or less likely to be based in reality. Past episodes of suicide attempts or violent behavior can be confirmed or disproven.

== Disposition ==
Patient receive emergency services often on a time limited basis such as 24 or 72 hours. After this time, and sometimes earlier, the staff must decide the next place for the patient to receive services. This is referred to as disposition. This is one of the essential features of emergency psychiatry.

=== Hospital admission ===
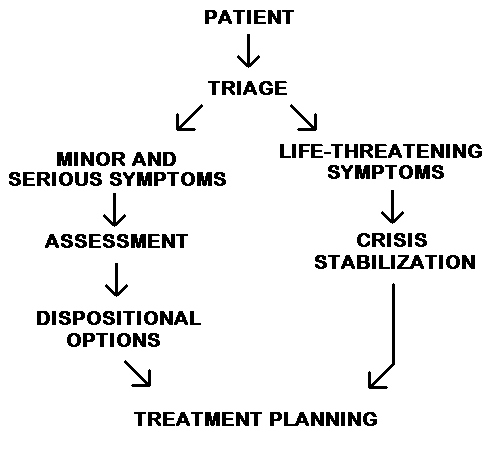
The emergency care process.

The staff will need to determine if the patient needs to be admitted to a psychiatric inpatient facility or if they can be safely discharged to the community after a period of observation and/or brief treatment. Initial emergency psychiatric evaluations usually involve patients who are acutely agitated, paranoid, or who are suicidal. Initial evaluations to determine admission and interventions are designed to be as therapeutic as possible.

==== Involuntary commitment ====
Involuntary commitment, or sectioning, refers to situations where police officers, health officers, or health professionals classify an individual as dangerous to themselves, others, gravely disabled, or mentally ill according to the applicable government law for the region. After an individual is transported to a psychiatric emergency service setting, a preliminary professional assessment is completed which may or may not result in involuntary treatment. Some patients may be discharged shortly after being brought to psychiatric emergency services while others will require longer observation and the need for continued involuntary commitment will exist. While some patients may initially come voluntarily, it may be realized that they pose a risk to themselves or others, and involuntary commitment may be initiated at that point.

==== Referrals and voluntary hospitalization ====
In some locations, such as the United States, voluntary hospitalizations are outnumbered by involuntary commitments partly due to the fact that insurance tends not to pay for hospitalization unless an imminent danger exists to the individual or community. In addition, psychiatric emergency service settings admit approximately one third of patients from assertive community treatment centers. Therefore, patients who are not admitted will be referred to services in the community.

== See also ==
- Betty Pfefferbaum, psychiatrist, mental health treatment for children after a disaster
- Medically indigent adult
- Mental health first aid
