= Obsessional jealousy =

Obsessional jealousy is jealousy that is characterized by intrusive and excessive thoughts, and may be accompanied by compulsive checking of the partner. It is not classified as a mental disorder in the psychiatric manuals DSM or ICD, but it is mentioned as an example of how obsessive compulsive disorder can present itself.

== Presentation ==
Its characteristics are:

1. Little resistance and distress associated with obsessional thoughts
2. Anger specifically directed at partner
3. Jealousy evident only in a committed relationship
4. Frequently monosymptomatic
5. Frequently responds at lower doses of SSRI
6. Rapid response in comparison with classical OCD

== See also ==
- Pathological jealousy
