= Military Medicine (journal) =

- Discipline: Military medicine
- Language: English
- Edited by: Stephen W. Rothwell

Publication details
- Former name(s): Transactions of the ... Annual Meeting of the Association of Military Surgeons of the National Guard of the United States, Journal of the Association of Military Surgeons of the United States, Military Surgeon
- History: 1891-present
- Publisher: Oxford University Press on behalf of the Association of Military Surgeons of the United States (United States)
- Frequency: Monthly
- Impact factor: 1.563 (2021)

Standard abbreviations
- ISO 4: Mil. Med.

Indexing
- CODEN: MMEDA9
- ISSN: 0026-4075 (print); 1930-613X (web)
- LCCN: 09019395
- OCLC no.: 55948875

Links
- Journal homepage; Online archive

Military Medicine is a monthly peer-reviewed medical journal covering all aspects of medicine in military settings. It is published by Oxford University Press on behalf of the Association of Military Surgeons of the United States. It was established in 1891 and the editor-in-chief is Stephen W. Rothwell.

== History ==
The journal was established in 1891 as Transactions of the ... Annual Meeting of the Association of Military Surgeons of the National Guard of the United States. The title was changed to Journal of the Association of Military Surgeons of the United States from 1901 to 1906, and then to Military Surgeon from 1907 to 1954, when it obtained its current title.

== Abstracting and indexing ==
The journal is abstracted and indexed in:

- Chemical Abstracts
- Current Contents/Clinical Medicine
- CINAHL
- Index Medicus/MEDLINE/PubMed
- Scopus
- Science Citation Index

According to the Journal Citation Reports, the journal has a 2021 impact factor of 1.563.
