= Egosyntonicity =

Behaviour or feelings consistent with self-image

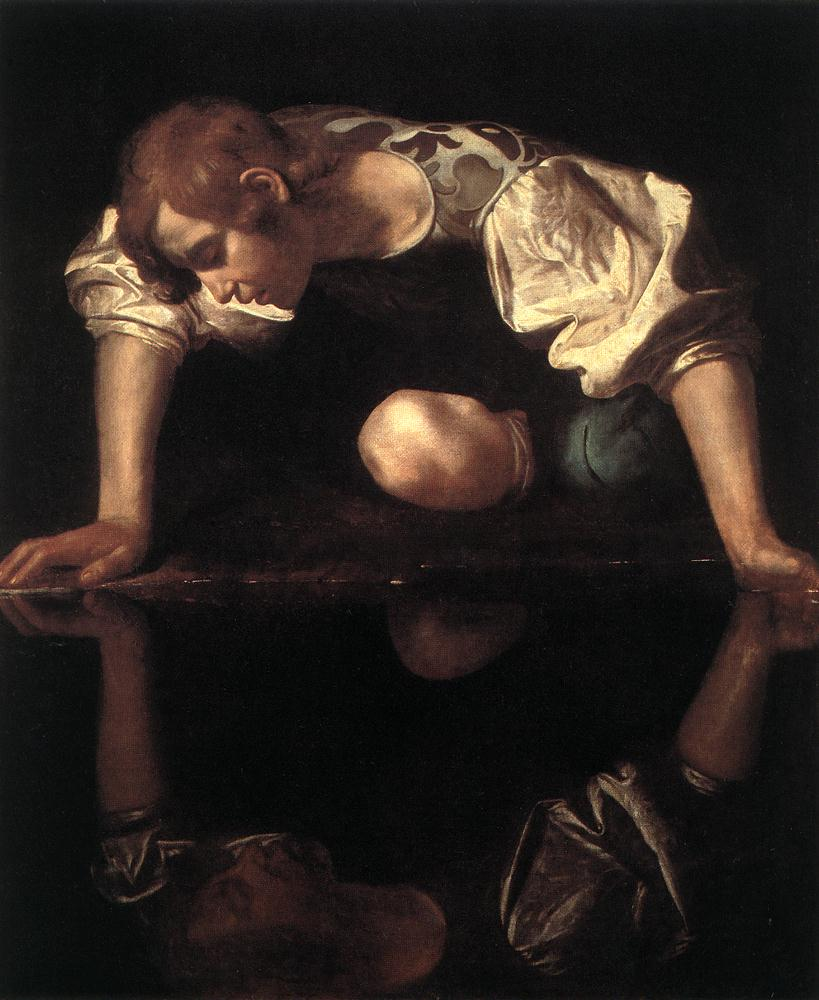
Narcissus by Caravaggio (1597–1599). Sigmund Freud introduced the concept of egosyntonicity in his 1914 essay On Narcissism.

In psychoanalysis, egosyntonic behaviors, values, and feelings are in harmony with or acceptable to the needs and goals of the ego, or consistent with one's ideal self-image. Egodystonic (or ego alien) behaviors are the opposite, referring to thoughts and behaviors (dreams, compulsions, desires, etc.) that are conflicting or dissonant with the needs and goals of the ego, or further, in conflict with a person's ideal self-image.

== Applicability ==
Abnormal psychology has studied egosyntonic and egodystonic concepts in some detail. Many personality disorders are egosyntonic, which makes their treatment difficult as the patients may not perceive anything wrong and view their perceptions and behavior as reasonable and appropriate. For example, a person with narcissistic personality disorder has an excessively positive self-regard and rejects suggestions that challenge this viewpoint. This corresponds to the general concept in psychiatry of poor insight. Anorexia nervosa, a difficult-to-treat disorder characterized by a distorted body image and fear of gaining weight, is also considered egosyntonic because many of its sufferers deny that they have a problem. Problem gambling, however, is only sometimes seen as egosyntonic, depending partly on the reactions of the individual involved and whether they know that their gambling is problematic.

An illustration of the differences between an egodystonic and egosyntonic mental disorder is in comparing obsessive–compulsive disorder (OCD) and obsessive–compulsive personality disorder (OCPD). OCD is considered to be egodystonic as the thoughts and compulsions experienced or expressed are not consistent with the individual's self-perception, meaning the thoughts are unwanted, distressing, and reflect the opposite of their values, desires, and self-construct. In contrast, obsessive–compulsive personality disorder is egosyntonic, as the patient generally perceives their obsession with orderliness, perfectionism, and control, as reasonable and even desirable.

== Freudian heritage ==
The words "egosyntonic" and "egodystonic" originated as early-1920s translations of the German words "ichgerecht" and "nicht ichgerecht", "ichfremd", or "ichwidrig", which were introduced in 1914 by Freud in his book On Narcissism and remained an important part of his conceptual inventory. Freud applied these words to the relationship between a person's "instincts" and their "ego." Freud saw psychic conflict arising when "the original lagging instincts … come into conflict with the ego (or ego-syntonic instincts)". According to him, "ego-dystonic" sexual instincts were bound to be "repressed." Anna Freud stated that psychological "defences" which were "ego-syntonic" were harder to expose than ego-dystonic impulses, because the former are 'familiar' and taken for granted. Later psychoanalytic writers emphasised how direct expression of the repressed was ego-dystonic, and indirect expression more ego-syntonic.

Otto Fenichel distinguished between morbid impulses, which he saw as ego-syntonic, and compulsive symptoms which struck their possessors as ego-alien. Heinz Hartmann, and after him ego psychology, also made central use of the twin concepts.

== See also ==
- Anosognosia
- Cognitive dissonance
- Ego-dystonic sexual orientation
- Guilty pleasure
- Insight § Psychiatry
