= Current Psychiatry Reports =

- Discipline: Psychiatry
- Language: English
- Edited by: Robert O. Friedel, Dwight L. Evans

Publication details
- History: 1999-present
- Publisher: Springer Science+Business Media
- Frequency: Bimonthly
- Impact factor: 8.081 (2021)

Standard abbreviations
- ISO 4: Curr. Psychiatry Rep.

Indexing
- ISSN: 1523-3812 (print); 1535-1645 (web)
- LCCN: 2001214701
- OCLC no.: 524517244

Links
- Journal homepage; Online access

Current Psychiatry Reports is a bimonthly peer-reviewed medical journal publishing review articles related to psychiatry. It was established in 1999 and is published by Springer Science+Business Media. The editors-in-chief are Robert O. Friedel (Medical College of Virginia) and Dwight L. Evans (University of Pennsylvania). According to the Journal Citation Reports, the journal has a 2021 impact factor of 8.081.
