= Rating scales for depression =

Psychometric tools to measure severity of depressive mood

- Purpose: to determine the presence and severity of depression

A depression rating scale is a psychometric instrument (tool), usually a questionnaire whose wording has been validated with experimental evidence, having descriptive words and phrases that indicate the severity of depression for a time period. When used, an observer may make judgements and rate a person at a specified scale level with respect to identified characteristics. Rather than being used to diagnose depression, a depression rating scale may be used to assign a score to a person's behaviour where that score may be used to determine whether that person should be evaluated more thoroughly for a depressive disorder diagnosis. Several rating scales are used for this purpose.

== Scales completed by clinicians, researchers, and workers ==
Some depression rating scales are completed by clinicians or researchers. The Hamilton Depression Rating Scale includes twenty-one questions, each having three to five possible responses that reflect increasing or decreasing severity. The clinician must choose the possible responses to each question by interviewing the patient and by observing the patient's symptoms. Designed by psychiatrist Max Hamilton in 1960, the Hamilton Depression Rating Scale is one of the two most commonly used among those completed by clinicians and researchers in assessing the effects of drug therapy. Alternatively, the Montgomery-Åsberg Depression Rating Scale (MADRS) features ten items to be completed for the purpose of assessing the effects of drug therapy, Another scale is the Raskin Depression Rating Scale rating the severity of the patients' symptoms in three areas: verbal reports, behavior, and secondary symptoms of depression. Finally, the Occupational Depression Inventory specifically focuses on depressive symptoms that people attribute to their jobs.

== Scales completed by patients ==
The two questions on the Patient Health Questionnaire-2 (PHQ-2):

During the past month, have you often been bothered by feeling down, depressed, or hopeless?

During the past month, have you often been bothered by little interest or pleasure in doing things?

Some depression rating scales are completed by patients. The Beck Depression Inventory, for example, is a 21-question self-report inventory that covers symptoms such as irritability, fatigue, weight loss, lack of interest in sex, and feelings of guilt, hopelessness or fear of being punished. The scale is completed by patients to identify the presence and severity of symptoms consistent with the DSM-IV diagnostic criteria. The Beck Depression Inventory was originally designed by psychiatrist Aaron T. Beck in 1961.

The Geriatric Depression Scale (GDS) is another self-administered scale, but in this case it is used for older patients, and for patients with mild to moderate dementia. Instead of presenting a five-category response set, the GDS questions are answered with a simple "yes" or "no". The Zung Self-Rating Depression Scale is similar to the Geriatric Depression Scale in that the answers are preformatted. In the Zung Self-Rating Depression Scale, there are 20 items: ten positively worded and ten negatively worded. Each question is rated on a scale of 1 through 4 based on four possible answers: "a little of the time", "some of the time", "good part of the time", and "most of the time".

The Patient Health Questionnaire (PHQ) sets are self-reported depression rating scales. For example, the Patient Health Questionnaire-9 (PHQ-9) is a self-reported, 9-question version of the Primary Care Evaluation of Mental Disorders. The Patient Health Questionnaire-2 (PHQ-2) is a shorter version of the PHQ-9 with two screening questions to assess the presence of a depressed mood and a loss of interest or pleasure in routine activities; a positive response to either question indicates further testing is required.

== Scales completed by patients and researchers ==
The Primary Care Evaluation of Mental Disorders (PRIME-MD) is completed by the patient and a researcher. This depression rating scale includes a 27-item screening questionnaire and follow-up clinician interview designed to facilitate the diagnosis of common mental disorders in primary care. Its lengthy administration time has limited its clinical usefulness; it has been replaced by the Patient Health Questionnaire (PHQ-9).

== Usefulness ==
Screening programs using rating scales to search for candidates for a more in-depth evaluation have been advocated to improve detection of depression, but there is evidence that they do not improve detection rates, treatment, or outcome. There is also evidence that a consensus on the interpretation of rating scales, in particular the Hamilton Rating Scale for Depression, is largely missing, leading to misdiagnosis of the severity of a patient's depression. However, there is evidence that portions of rating scales, such as the somatic section of the PHQ-9, can be useful in predicting outcomes for subgroups of patients like coronary heart disease patients.

== Mathematical models of the distributions on rating scales for depression ==
Because the majority of individuals in the general population have a few or no depressive symptoms, the item score and total score distributions on rating scales for depression are usually skewed to the right. Recent research has revealed that item score and total score distributions on such scales exhibit a common mathematical pattern in general population samples. Specifically, total scores on these scales follow an exponential distribution, except for the lower end of the distribution. Furthermore, responses to all depressive symptom items show a proportional relationship between response options, except for the lower end option. These findings have been confirmed repeatedly by analyzing large-scale data collected from dozens of nationally representative surveys in the US, EU, and Japan.

== Copyrighted vs. public domain scales ==
The Beck Depression Inventory is copyrighted, a fee must be paid for each copy used, and photocopying it is a violation of copyright. There is no evidence that the BDI-II is more valid or reliable than other depression scales, and public domain scales such as the Major Depression Inventory, the revised Center for Epidemiological Studies Depression Scale (CES-D-R), the Zung Depression scale and Patient Health Questionnaire – Nine Item (PHQ-9) have been studied as a useful tools.

Other copyrighted scales allow individual clinicians and researchers to make copies for their own use, but require licenses for electronic versions or large-scale redistribution.

== List of depression rating scales ==
- Beck Depression Inventory (BDI, BDI-1A, BDI-II), there is a fee to use the BDI.
- Beck Hopelessness Scale, there is a fee to use the scale.
- Behavioral Activation for Depression Scale (BADS-SF)
- Brief Psychiatric Rating Scale (BPRS)
- Center for Epidemiologic Studies Depression Scale (CES-D)
- Children's Depression Inventory (CDI)
- Children's Depression Rating Scale (CDRS)
- Clinically Useful Depression Outcome Scale (CUDOS)
- Columbia Suicide Severity Rating Scale (C-SSRS)
- Depression and Anxiety Stress Scales (DASS)
- Depression Self-Rating Scale for Children
- Edinburgh Postnatal Depression Scale
- General Health Questionnaire
- Geriatric Depression Scale (GDS)
- Hamilton Rating Scale (HRSDD, HDRS, Ham-D)
- HEADS-ED, used in hospital emergency departments
- Hospital Anxiety and Depression Scale
- Inventory of Depressive Symptomatology (IDS)
- Kutcher Adolescent Depression Scale (KADS-11)
- Major Depression Inventory (MDI)
- Montgomery-Asberg Depression Scale (MADRS)
- Mood and Feelings Questionnaire (MFQ)
- Occupational Depression Inventory No charge to researchers & practitioners
- Patient Health Questionnaire (PHQ-9). Nine-item depression symptom scale keyed to the nine DSM-5 symptoms of major depression.
- Primary Care Evaluation of Mental Disorders (PRIME-MD)
- Quick Inventory of Depressive Symptoms (QIDS)
- Quick Inventory of Depressive Symptomatology Clinician (QIDS-C)
- Quick Inventory of Depressive Symptomatology Self Report (QIDS-SR)

== Questions regarding the validity of depression rating scales ==
Several research articles have come out in the past several years that investigate the validity of sum-score rating scales for depression.

- Bianchi, Renzo; Verkuilen, Jay; Toker, Sharon; Schonfeld, Irvin Sam; Gerber, Markus; Brähler, Elmar; Kroenke, Kurt (2022). "Is the PHQ-9 a unidimensional measure of depression? A 58,272-participant study". Psychological Assessment. 34 (6): 595–603. doi:10.1037/pas0001124. PMID 35357877.
- Fried, Eiko I. (2017). "The 52 symptoms of major depression: Lack of content overlap among seven common depression scales". Journal of Affective Disorders. 208: 191–197. doi:10.1016/j.jad.2016.10.019. PMID 27792962.
- Santor, Darcy A.; Gregus, Michelle; Welch, Andrew (2006). "FOCUS ARTICLE: Eight Decades of Measurement in Depression". Measurement: Interdisciplinary Research & Perspective. 4 (3): 135–155. doi:10.1207/s15366359mea0403_1.

== See also ==
- Center for Epidemiological Studies Depression Scale (CES-D)
- Diagnostic classification and rating scales used in psychiatry
- Goldberg test
- Psychological symptom scales
