= Adult attention deficit hyperactivity disorder =

Neurodevelopmental disorder

- Other names: Adult ADHD, adult with ADHD, ADHD in adults, AADD
- Specialty: Psychiatry, Clinical psychology

Adult attention deficit hyperactivity disorder (adult ADHD) is ADHD that persists into adulthood. It is a neurodevelopmental disorder, meaning impairing symptoms must have been present in childhood, except for when ADHD occurs after traumatic brain injury. According to the DSM-5 diagnostic criteria, multiple symptoms should have been present before the age of 12. This represents a change from the DSM-IV, which required symptom onset before the age of 7. This was implemented to add flexibility in the diagnosis of adults. ADHD was previously thought to be a childhood disorder that improved with age, but later research challenged this theory. Approximately two-thirds of children with ADHD continue to experience impairing symptoms into adulthood, with symptoms ranging from minor inconveniences to impairments in daily functioning, and up to one-third continue to meet the full diagnostic criteria.

This new insight on ADHD is further reflected in the DSM-5, which lists ADHD as a disorder and has distinct requirements for children and adults. Per DSM-5 criteria, children must display "six or more symptoms in either the inattentive or hyperactive-impulsive domain, or both," for the diagnosis of ADHD. Older adolescents and adults (age 17 and older) need to demonstrate at least five symptoms before the age of 12 in either domain to meet diagnostic criteria. The International Classification of Diseases 11th Revision (ICD-11) also updated its diagnostic criteria to better align with the new DSM-5 criteria, but in a change from the DSM-5 and the ICD-10, while it lists the key characteristics of ADHD, the ICD-11 does not specify an age of onset, the required number of symptoms that should be exhibited, or duration of symptoms. The research on this topic continues to develop, with some of the most recent studies indicating that ADHD does not necessarily begin in childhood.

A final update to the DSM-5 from the DSM-IV revised the way it classifies ADHD symptoms, exchanging "subtypes" for "presentations" to better represent the fluidity of ADHD features displayed by individuals across development and contexts.

== Presentations ==
Symptom manifestation and severity of ADHD vary greatly among individuals. Hyperactivity begins decreasing in adolescence. Inattention is more common than hyperactivity, manifesting as difficulty starting and completing tasks, forgetfulness, a lack of persistence, disorganization, and excessive tardiness. A combined presentation is a combination of hyperactivity, inattention, and impulsivity.

ADHD can be diagnosed only by licensed clinicians. Diagnosis is made clinically, via a comprehensive, structured interview whose purpose is to get full history of the individual's current and childhood symptoms and their negative impact on daily functioning. A complete medical history should also be obtained, because the rates of coexistent conditions (comorbidities) with ADHD are high. Supplemental history from people close to the individual in different settings, such as parents, siblings, romantic partners, teachers, coworkers, and employers, can support a diagnosis.

ADHD is a highly genetically influenced condition, meaning it commonly runs in families. Individuals with a first-degree relative with ADHD demonstrate a risk of ADHD 4-5 times higher than the general population rate and have prevalence rates of around 20%. The rate of inheriting the disorder is estimated to be about 76% among children and adolescents and between 70 and 80% among adults. The exact causes of ADHD are still not fully understood, but twin studies indicate that non-genetic biological risk factors (e.g., low birth weight, events during pregnancy) and non-shared environmental events also contribute to the development of ADHD.

Effective management of ADHD generally requires a combination of psychoeducation (teaching affected individuals about ADHD and its presentation and effects), behavioral interventions (e.g., cognitive behavioral therapy (CBT)), pharmacotherapy (treatment utilizing medication), and coaching for ADHD. Psychostimulants, or simply stimulants, are considered the first-line medication for the treatment of ADHD. Particularly for adults, amphetamines (e.g., dexamphetamine) are considered the most effective medication.

== Classification ==
=== ADHD presentations ===
The Diagnostic and Statistical Manual of Mental Disorders, 5th edition (DSM-5) categorizes ADHD into three presentations:

1. Predominantly Inattentive Presentation (ADHD-I)
  - Meets criteria for inattentive but not hyperactive-impulsive presentation
2. Predominantly Hyperactive-Impulsive Presentation (ADHD-HI)
  - Meets criteria for hyperactive-impulsive but not inattentive presentation
3. Combined Presentation (ADHD-C)
  - Meets criteria for both inattentive and hyperactive-impulsive presentations

ADHD-I is the most common presentation among adults, with 45% of adults with ADHD meeting criteria for the predominantly inattentive presentation. 34% of adults with ADHD meet criteria for the combined presentation (ADHD-C), and 21% of adults with ADHD meet criteria for the predominantly hyperactive-impulsive presentation (ADHD-HI).

=== Diagnostic criteria ===
The DSM-5 lists 18 possible symptoms that a person may exhibit that would be consistent with a diagnosis of ADHD. There are nine inattentive symptoms and nine hyperactive-impulsive symptoms. Older adolescents and adults (age 17 and older) only need to demonstrate five symptoms in either the inattentive or hyperactive-impulsive presentation to meet the criteria for diagnosis. This differs from the required six symptoms in either presentation for children to meet diagnostic criteria.

In accordance with the updates to the DSM-5, published in 2013, the other criteria necessary for a diagnosis of ADHD in adults are as follows:

- Symptoms have been present for at least 6 consecutive months
- Symptoms do not match the individual's level of development
- Several symptoms onset before age 12 years
- Several symptoms manifest in two or more domains (e.g., home, school, work)
- Symptoms disrupt or diminish social, academic, and occupational performance
- Symptoms cannot be better explained by another psychiatric disorder

== Signs and symptoms ==
ADHD is a chronic condition, beginning in early childhood, and can persist throughout a person's lifetime. It is estimated that 33–66% of children with ADHD will continue to have significant ADHD-related symptoms persisting into adulthood, resulting in a significant impact on education, employment, and interpersonal relationships.

Individuals with ADHD exhibit deficiencies in self-regulation and self-motivation, which in turn foster problematic characteristics such as distractibility, procrastination, and disorganization. They are often perceived by others as chaotic, with a tendency to need high stimulation to be less distracted and function effectively. The learning potential and overall intelligence of an adult with ADHD, however, are no different from the potential and intelligence of adults who do not have the disorder.

Whereas teachers and caregivers responsible for children are often attuned to the symptoms of ADHD, employers and others who interact with adults are less likely to regard such behaviors as a symptom. In part, this is because symptoms do change with maturity; adults who have ADHD are less likely to exhibit obvious hyperactive behaviors. Instead, they may report constant mental activity and inner restlessness as their hyperactivity internalizes.

Symptoms of ADHD (see table below) can vary widely between individuals, and throughout the lifetime of an individual. As the neurobiology of ADHD is becoming increasingly understood, it is becoming evident that difficulties exhibited by individuals with ADHD are due to problems with the parts of the brain responsible for executive functions (see below: Pathophysiology). These result in problems with sustaining attention, planning, organization, prioritization, time management, impulse control, and decision making.

The difficulties generated by these deficiencies can range from moderate to extreme, resulting in the inability to effectively structure their lives, plan daily tasks, or think of and act accordingly even when aware of potential consequences. These can lead to poor performance in school and work and can be followed by underachievement in these areas. In young adults, poor driving records with traffic violations may surface.

As problems accumulate, a negative self-view becomes established and a vicious circle of failure is set up. Up to 80% of adults may have some form of psychiatric comorbidity, such as depression or anxiety. Many with ADHD also have associated learning disabilities, such as dyslexia, which contributes to their difficulties.

Studies on adults with ADHD have shown that, more often than not, they experience self-stigma and depression in childhood, commonly resulting from feeling neglected and different from their peers. These problems may play a role in the high levels of depression, substance abuse, and relationship problems that affect adults with ADHD later in life.

Emotional dysregulation, or the inability to properly manage one's emotions, as demonstrated by low frustration tolerance, irritability, negative emotional outbursts, and emotional lability, has been found to be a key symptom of ADHD in all age groups. Unlike other symptoms of ADHD that tend to improve or decline with age, emotional dysregulation has been shown to be more persistent into adulthood. Despite the increasing recognition among clinicians of emotion dysregulation as a prominent symptom of ADHD, especially among adults, it is not recognized in the DSM-5 as a core symptom of ADHD for diagnostic criteria. However, the DSM-5 does include the symptoms of emotional dysregulation as "associated features" that can support the diagnosis of ADHD.

Inattentive-type (ADHD-I)	Hyperactive/impulsive-type (ADHD-HI)
In children: Forgetful during daily activities; Easily distracted by extraneous stimuli; Losing important items (e.g. pencils, homework, toys, etc.); Always asking for attention, but; Not listening and not responding to names being called out; Unable to focus on tasks at hand, cannot sustain attention in activities; Avoids or dislikes tasks requiring sustained mental effort; Makes careless mistakes by failing to pay attention to details; Difficulty organizing tasks and activities; Fails to follow through on complex instructions and tasks (e.g. homework, chores, etc.)	In children: Squirms and fidgets (with hands and/or feet); Cannot sit still; Cannot play quietly or engage in leisurely activities; Talks excessively; Runs and climbs excessively; Always on the go, as if "driven by a motor"; Cannot wait for their turn; Blurts out answers; Intrudes on others and interrupts conversations
In adults: Avoiding tasks or jobs that require concentration; Procrastination; Difficulty initiating tasks; Difficulty organizing details required for a task; Difficulty recalling details required for a task; Difficulty multitasking; Poor time management, losing track of time; Indecision and doubt; Hesitation of execution; Difficulty persevering or completing and following through on tasks; Delayed stop and transition of concentration from one task to another	In adults: Fidgets with or taps hands or squirms in chair; Has difficulty remaining seated; Extreme restlessness; Talks excessively; Interrupts or intrudes on others; Has difficulty waiting their turn; Difficulty engaging in activities quietly; Blurts out answers before questions have been completed

== Diagnosis ==
=== Screening for ADHD in adults ===
ADHD can only be diagnosed by a licensed clinician, and the first step to do so is via screening with validated tools to screen for ADHD in adults. The Adult ADHD Self Report Rating Scale (ASRS) is a validated screening tool recognized by the World Health Organization (WHO) with a sensitivity and specificity of 91.4% and 96.0%, respectively. Screening can guide clinical decision-making toward the proper diagnostic and treatment methods, can prevent further negative outcomes, and can reduce medical costs that may result from underdiagnosis. Individuals who should be screened for ADHD include any adult with a chronic history of behaviors consistent with inattention, hyperactivity, impulsivity, restlessness, and emotional instability that started in childhood or early adolescence. Due to its high rates of heritability, adults with a first-degree relative with ADHD should also be screened. Other high-risk groups that should be screened include adults with a history of chronic mental health disorders (including, but not limited to, anxiety, depression, bipolar disorder), due to the high rates of comorbidity; adults within the criminal justice system or with a history of behavioral issues; and adults with multiple physical diseases.

=== Diagnosing ADHD in adults ===
If an individual screens positively for ADHD, the formal diagnosis is made clinically through a structured, comprehensive interview. The primary aim of this interview is to establish a detailed history of current symptoms and determine how these symptoms impair functioning in daily activities. Clinicians must also obtain a history of symptoms during childhood, as ADHD is a neurodevelopmental disorder that begins early in life.

Whenever possible, collateral information should be collected from individuals close to the patient—such as parents, siblings, partners, or colleagues—to provide additional perspectives on symptom patterns and impairment across different settings. Such input can be particularly valuable because adults often have limited recall of their childhood symptoms and may under- or overestimate the severity of their current difficulties. This may stem from poor self-awareness, memory bias, or the development of compensatory coping strategies over time.

In addition to assessing ADHD symptoms directly, the diagnostic interview typically includes an evaluation for co-occurring psychiatric or medical conditions, as these can mimic or exacerbate attentional and executive functioning problems.

ADHD cannot be diagnosed using symptom rating scales, neuropsychological assessments, or brain imaging in isolation. These tools may, however, be used to screen for the disorder, support a clinical diagnosis, or help quantify symptom severity and functional impairment.

==== Screening tools ====
- Adult ADHD Self-Report Scale (ASRS)
- Wender Utah Rating Scale

==== Diagnosis tools ====
- Diagnostic Interview for ADHD in Adults, third edition (DIVA-5)
  - DIVA-5-ID (adapted version for people with intellectual disability)
- ACE+ (semi-structured diagnostic interview to assess for ADHD in adults, >16 years)
- Conners Adult ADHD Diagnostic Interview for DSM-IV (CAADID)
- Adult ADHD Clinical Diagnostic Scale (ACDS v1.2)
- Continuous Performance Tests (CPTs) (cognitive tests of attention and executive function)

=== Barriers to diagnosis of ADHD in adults ===
Adults face many potential difficulties in obtaining a diagnosis of ADHD. The diagnosis is often missed in the clinical setting in adults as a result of insufficient knowledge among clinicians about ADHD in adults. This lack of knowledge may cause some clinicians to not diagnose ADHD in adults because they are worried about misdiagnosing it, do not feel comfortable prescribing stimulants, or are worried about worsening patients' coexisting conditions. Additionally, clinicians commonly overlook symptoms of ADHD and/or fail to consider it as a diagnosis in adults due to the overlap in symptoms with other psychiatric conditions, such as anxiety disorders, mood disorders, substance use disorders, and personality disorders. The symptoms of these psychiatric disorders may mask the symptoms of ADHD and lead clinicians to consider these disorders over ADHD. ADHD also has high rates of comorbidity with these disorders in adulthood, further leading clinicians to pursue evaluation for these disorders over ADHD. Furthermore, the stigma surrounding ADHD causes many adults to forego seeking treatment altogether.

Another barrier to diagnosis is faced by highly intelligent or high-functioning adults. These individuals are more likely to develop compensatory skills earlier in life to overcome the symptoms of undiagnosed ADHD and adapt to their environments, which can suppress some of the more obvious symptoms or behaviors of ADHD. As a result, when they seek treatment as adults, they may not demonstrate the level of dysfunction that is more readily recognized in individuals with ADHD.

Diagnosis of ADHD can also be delayed in adults due to a lack of universal consensus on diagnostic criteria for diagnosing ADHD in adults as well as poor adherence by primary care physicians and mental health providers to current recommendations.

== ADHD in adult males ==
The most common ADHD presentation in adulthood is predominantly inattentive (ADHD-I). Males demonstrate higher levels of symptom resolution in adulthood. Adult males with ADHD have higher rates of incarceration than adult males without ADHD. Compared to adult females with ADHD, the rate of incarceration for adult males is also higher, 31.2% for males versus 22.1% for females.

Males with ADHD, children, and adults exhibit higher rates of externalizing disorders or behaviors that manifest as aggressive, disruptive, rule-breaking behaviors, making them more likely to be referred for ADHD treatment. Adult males with ADHD are also more likely to display antisocial behaviors associated with antisocial personality disorder. Adults with ADHD are more prone to reckless driving and more frequent and severe crashes, with some studies showing an increased frequency in adult males with ADHD compared to females.

Other results of adult ADHD are higher reported incidences of traffic citations, missed workdays, and accidents. According to Fritz in a 2016 study, adult men with ADHD may be able to focus better on mental tasks after completing some type of physical exertion. This may help individuals who suffer from adult ADHD. Mood improvements were shown to be statistically significant for a short while, but quickly, the mood would return to pre-exertion levels.

== ADHD in adult females ==
=== Symptomatology ===
There is increasing evidence that females with ADHD have symptom manifestations different from the typical symptoms or behaviors observed in males. While males are more likely to display the commonly recognized disruptive behaviors of ADHD, especially in childhood, females typically display more subtle behaviors of hyperactivity-impulsivity and/or are more likely to fit the inattentive presentation, leading to delayed diagnosis in females. Of note, despite the variation in symptom severity and presentation, ADHD-HI is the most common presentation in preschoolers for both sexes. Clinicians should be aware that just like males, females can also exhibit symptoms of inattention as well as hyperactivity-impulsivity.

Impulsivity in females with ADHD often manifests as excessive talking, blurting out responses, interrupting others, and fidgeting. In females with ADHD, inattention often manifests as susceptibility to distraction, disorganization, feeling overwhelmed, forgetfulness, absence of effort or motivation, and difficulty receiving constructive criticism in professional settings. Females with ADHD also exhibit greater internalizing disorders (i.e., mood disorders) than males with ADHD. Notable symptoms of ADHD specific to adult females include lower self-esteem which can lead to self-harm, greater difficulty in maintaining relationships, increased risk of anxiety and/or mood disorders. Females, beginning in childhood, are also more likely to develop compensatory strategies that may ultimately mask some of the primary symptoms of ADHD, because of societal gender roles that pressure young women/girls to take up less space and not be disruptive.

=== Prevalence ===
The most common ADHD presentation in adulthood is predominantly inattentive (ADHD-I). ADHD-I is also the most common presentation for females in childhood, and the symptoms of inattention have been shown to persist into adulthood more than those of the hyperactive-impulsive presentation more commonly observed in boys. Consequently, females demonstrate a higher frequency of a "life-persistent" form of ADHD, which helps explain the narrowing male-to-female diagnostic ratio from childhood to adulthood. Another possible explanation for the male-to-female diagnostic ratio seen in adulthood is that adult diagnosis relies more heavily on self-report than reports from parents or teachers. Adult females are more likely than adult males to report issues and seek treatment, leading to increasing diagnosis rates in adult females and closing the prevalence sex gap.

== Pathophysiology ==
Over the last 30 years, research into ADHD has greatly increased. There is no single, unified theory that explains the cause of ADHD. Genetic factors are presumed important, and it has been suggested that environmental factors may affect how symptoms manifest.

It is becoming increasingly accepted that individuals with ADHD have difficulty with "executive functioning". In higher organisms, such as humans, these functions are thought to reside in the frontal lobes. They enable recall of tasks that need accomplishing, organization to accomplish these tasks, assessment of consequences of actions, prioritization of thoughts and actions, keeping track of time, awareness of interactions with surroundings, the ability to focus despite competing stimuli, and adaptation to changing situations.

Several lines of research based on structural and/or functional imaging techniques, stimulant drugs, and psychological interventions have identified alterations in the dopaminergic and adrenergic pathways of individuals with ADHD. In particular, areas of the prefrontal cortex appear to be the most affected. Dopamine and norepinephrine are neurotransmitters which play an important role in brain function. The uptake transporters for dopamine and norepinephrine are overly active and clear these neurotransmitters from the synapse a lot faster than in other individuals. This is thought to increase processing latency and salience, and diminish working memory.

== Treatment ==
As a first step, adults with ADHD should receive psychoeducation about ADHD so they understand the diagnosis. This is vital to ensure that adults with ADHD can make informed decisions about their treatment and have other benefits, such as improved relationships with others. Treatment often begins with medication selected to address the symptoms of ADHD, along with any comorbid conditions that may be present. Medication alone, while sometimes effective in correcting the physiological symptoms of ADHD, will not address the paucity of skills that many adults will have acquired because of their ADHD (e.g., one might regain the ability to focus with medication, but skills such as organizing, prioritizing, and effectively communicating have taken others time to cultivate). Suggested treatment for adult ADHD is to include a combined approach of psychosocial interventions (behavioural or cognitive), medication, vocational interventions, and regular follow-up support.

=== Medications ===
Medications to help treat ADHD include psychostimulants and non-stimulants. Guidelines and availability of the different options available for medication may vary depending on what country the person lives in.

==== Stimulants ====
Stimulants have moderate-to-high effects, which have higher average effects than non-stimulant medications. A 2025 meta-analytic systematic review of 113 randomized controlled trials demonstrated that stimulant medications significantly improved core ADHD symptoms in adults over a three-month period, with good acceptability compared to other pharmacological and non-pharmacological treatments. For adults, amphetamines in particular are the most efficacious medications, and they (along with methylphenidate) have the fewest adverse effects. While there is some debate about whether to treat ADHD adults with substance use disorder (SUD) with stimulants, the 2019 Updated European Consensus Statement on diagnosis and treatment of adult ADHD notes that "in SUD patients, treatment of ADHD [with stimulants] can be useful to reduce ADHD symptoms without worsening the SUD and should not be avoided".

Amphetamine and its derivatives, prototype stimulants, are available in immediate and long-acting formulations. Amphetamines act by multiple mechanisms, including reuptake inhibition, displacement of transmitters from vesicles, reversal of uptake transporters, and reversible MAO inhibition. Thus amphetamines actively increase the release of these neurotransmitters into the synaptic cleft. In the short term, methylphenidate, a benzylpiperidine and phenethylamine derivative stimulant medication, is well tolerated. As of a 2008 review, long-term studies had not been conducted in adults, although no serious side effects had been reported to regulatory authorities.

In the UK, clinical guidelines recommend that psychostimulants be used as a first-line treatment. For people who cannot be treated with stimulants due to a substance use disorder or other contraindications, atomoxetine is the suggested first-line treatment in the UK. In Canada, clinical guidelines suggest that first-line treatment be methylphenidate or lisdexamfetamine. Non-stimulant medications are generally second-line treatments in Canada.

==== Non-stimulant medications ====
The non-stimulant atomoxetine (Strattera) may be an effective treatment for adult ADHD. Although atomoxetine has a half-life similar to stimulants, it exhibits a delayed onset of therapeutic effects similar to antidepressants. Unlike stimulants, which are generally controlled substances, atomoxetine lacks addictive potential. It is particularly effective for those with the predominantly inattentive concentration type of attention deficit due to being primarily a norepinephrine reuptake inhibitor. It is often prescribed in adults who cannot tolerate the side effects of amphetamines or methylphenidate. It is also approved for ADHD by the US Food and Drug Administration. A rare but potentially severe side effect includes liver damage and increased suicidal ideation. Reboxetine, also a selective norepinephrine reuptake inhibitor, may be used off-label as an alternative to atomoxetine.

Viloxazine, another selective norepinephrine reuptake inhibitor, was FDA-approved to treat ADHD in children, adolescents, and adults.

Bupropion and desipramine are two antidepressants that have demonstrated some evidence of effectiveness in the management of ADHD, particularly when there is comorbid major depression, although antidepressants have lower treatment effect sizes.

=== Psychotherapy ===
Psychotherapy, including behavioral therapy, can help an adult with ADHD monitor their own behaviour and provide skills for improving organization and efficiency in daily tasks. Research has shown that, alongside medication, psychological interventions in adults can be effective in reducing symptomatic deficiencies. Cognitive behavioral therapy in particular can provide benefits, especially alongside medication, in the treatment of adult ADHD.

== Epidemiology ==
While ADHD has traditionally been viewed as a childhood disorder that fades with age, growing research has shown that ADHD often persists from childhood into adulthood. Approximately 40–60% of individuals diagnosed with ADHD in childhood continue to exhibit some symptoms of it in adulthood, while approximately 15% continue to meet full diagnostic criteria. An umbrella review of worldwide childhood prevalence rates of ADHD, published in 2023, reported a combined prevalence of 8.0% in children globally. This same review reported a global combined prevalence of ADHD of 10% in boys and 5% in girls. While the male-to-female ratio of ADHD diagnoses in childhood is about 2.3:1 in children, it approaches 1.5:1 or lower in adulthood. This is consistent with research revealing underdiagnosis of ADHD in females during childhood.

Due to the age-dependent decrease in symptoms of ADHD, the prevalence among adults is lower than that in children. A meta-analysis of the global prevalence of ADHD in adults, published in 2021, estimated a collective prevalence of persistent adult ADHD of 2.58% globally in 2020. Persistent adult ADHD is defined as meeting diagnostic criteria for ADHD in adulthood with the additional requirement of a confirmed childhood diagnosis. This rate was compared to symptomatic adult ADHD, defined as meeting symptomatic diagnostic criteria for ADHD in adulthood without the requirement of a childhood diagnosis, which had an estimated combined prevalence of 6.76% globally in 2020. When assessing the prevalence of persistent adult ADHD by World Bank regions (high-income countries (HICs) vs. low- and middle-income countries (LMICs)), the prevalence of persistent adult ADHD is significantly lower in HICs than in LMICs, with rates of 3.25% and 8.00%, respectively. Estimating the prevalence of persistent adult ADHD by age demonstrated decreasing prevalence with increasing age, which is consistent with other studies that have shown that ADHD symptoms tend to diminish with age.

Persistent adult ADHD
Age Group (in years)	Prevalence (%)
18-24	5.05
25-29	4.00
30-34	3.29
35-39	2.70
40-44	2.22
45-49	1.82
50-54	1.49
55-59	1.22
60+	0.77

Another meta-analysis, published in 2020, specifically examined the prevalence of ADHD in older adults, defined as 45 years and older. It estimated prevalence in older adults based on three different assessment methods: research diagnosis (based on DSM-validated scales), clinical diagnosis (based on clinical interview meeting DSM or ICD criteria), and treatment. The combined prevalence of ADHD in older adults by research diagnosis was estimated to be 2.18%, accordant with the age-dependent decline of ADHD. The combined prevalence of ADHD in older adults by clinical diagnosis was estimated to be 0.23%. The discrepancy in prevalence between research diagnosis and clinical diagnosis might be explained by either a potential overestimate by ADHD-rating scales or underdiagnosis by clinicians. Lastly, the prevalence of treatment for ADHD in older adults was estimated to be 0.09%, which was less than half of the prevalence of clinically diagnosed ADHD.

== History ==
Early work on disorders of attention was conducted by Alexander Crichton in 1798, who wrote about "mental restlessness.". The underlying condition came to be recognized in the early 1900s by Sir George Still. The efficacy of medications on symptoms was discovered during the 1930s, and research continued throughout the twentieth century. ADHD in adults began to be studied in the 1990s and research has increased as worldwide interest in the condition has grown.

In the 1970s, researchers began to realize that the condition now known as ADHD did not always disappear in adolescence, as was once thought. The expansion of the definition for ADHD beyond only being a condition experienced by children was mainly accomplished by refocusing the diagnosis on inattention instead of hyperactivity. At about the same time, some of the symptoms were also noted in many parents of the children under treatment. Having this correlation between the parent and child indicates that biological factors may play a role in the inheritance of ADHD.

== Society and culture ==
ADHD in adults, as with children, is recognized as an impairment that may constitute a disability under U.S. federal disability nondiscrimination laws, including such laws as the Rehabilitation Act of 1973 and the Americans With Disabilities Act (ADA, 2008 revision), if the disorder substantially limits one or more of an individual's major life activities. For adults whose ADHD does constitute a disability, workplaces have a duty to provide reasonable accommodations, and educational institutions have a duty to provide appropriate academic adjustments or modifications, to help the individual work more efficiently and productively.

In a 2004 study, it was estimated that the yearly income discrepancy for adults with ADHD was $10,791 less per year than their high school graduate counterparts and $4,334 lower for college graduate counterparts. The study estimates a total loss in productivity in the United States of over US$77 billion.

== Controversy ==
ADHD controversies include concerns about its existence as a disorder, its causes, the methods by which ADHD is diagnosed and treated including the use of stimulant medications in children, possible overdiagnosis, misdiagnosis as ADHD leading to undertreatment of the real underlying disease, alleged hegemonic practices of the American Psychiatric Association and negative stereotypes of children diagnosed with ADHD. These controversies have surrounded the subject since at least the 1970s.

With the drastic growth of patients in recent years, Adult ADHD, being more recently identified compared to ADHD in children, contains even more instability and controversy in terms of diagnosis. The problem of overdiagnosis is especially emphasized, as the criteria in the DSM focuses on routine screening and symptom checklists, yet lacks consideration for other sources of information like self-report, clinical interviews, neuropsychological testing, etc.
