= Drug combination =

Drug combination may refer to:

- Combination drug
- Combined drug intoxication
- Drug interaction
- Polypharmacy
- Polysubstance use
- Polysubstance dependence
