= Bipolar Spectrum Diagnostic Scale =

Screening questionnaire for bipolar disorders

The Bipolar Spectrum Diagnostic Scale (BSDS) is a psychiatric self-rating scale created by Ronald Pies in screening for bipolar disorder (BD). Its initial version consists of a descriptive narrative aimed to capture the nuances and milder variants of BD. Upon revision by Nassir Ghaemi and colleagues, the scale was developed into two sections for a total of 20 questions. The BSDS is widely accepted as an important measure of bipolar disorder alongside other diagnostic tools such as the Mood Disorder Questionnaire and the Bipolar Depression Rating Scale.

== Background ==
Bipolar disorder (BD) is a psychiatric disorder defined by intermittent episodes of depression and (hypo)mania during the individual's lifetime. The DSM-5 and ICD-11 recognise bipolar disorder as a spectrum with three specific subtypes: bipolar I disorder, bipolar II disorder and cyclothymic disorder. The lifetime prevalence of bipolar I is approximately 1% in the general population, while bipolar II is an additional 1.1% The broader definition of bipolar spectrum disorder includes as much as 6% of the population.

As a result of the broad and complex nature of bipolar disorder, misdiagnosis is fairly common: 69% of confirmed cases are found to be initially misdiagnosed and more than a third of individuals are misdiagnosed for ten years onwards. For individuals with milder symptoms of BD, this seems to be even more prevalent.

The BSDS was devised to estimate not only severe cases of bipolar disorder, but also milder variants in a more sensitive manner. The scale is ideal for screening, but not for diagnosing BD as the 19 questions do not accurately reflect the main criterion of the DSM-5. The scale has however been found to accurately rule out a diagnosis of BD altogether for an individual.

== Development ==
The original English Version of the BSDS consists of a descriptive passage with nineteen statements ending with a blank space. Patients are first advised to read through the entire passage before starting the assessment. Once completed, they are asked to place a check next to each of the nineteen items they feel relates to their personal experience of BD. Each check is worth one point. The passage is written entirely in a third person narrative.

When assessed by Nassir Ghaemi and colleagues, the original scale demonstrated a high diagnostic sensitivity at 0.76, meaning that most people with clinicians' DSM-5-based cases were accurately diagnosed. The BSDS also correctly identified 85% of unipolar-depressed patients as not having bipolar disorder despite similarities in symptoms, indicating a high specificity score.

To improve the original version, Ghaemi created an additional section for the BSDS. This section involved a 4-item Likert scale assessing the extent to which individuals felt that the passage related to their own experience of BD. The 4 item scale includes statements of "This story fits me very well." (worth 6 points), "This story fits me fairly well." (worth 4 points), "This story fits me to some degree but not in most respects." (worth 2 points), to "This story does not really describe me at all." (worth 0 points). The abridged version of BSDS scores range from 0-25 points with the positive threshold for diagnosis at 13 points and above.

The likelihood of BD according to the BSDS is given based on the overall score of both sections. Scores of 0-6 indicates a "highly unlikely" chance of having BD, 7-12 indicates a "low probability", 13-19 indicates a "moderate probability", and a score of 20-25 indicates a "high probability".

Ghaemi's BSDS version increased specificity from the original version from 0.85 to 0.93. The BSDS has since been adjusted and adapted for several other global populations, including Persia, Turkey, and Mexico.

== Reliability and validity ==
The BSDS is a well validated diagnostic tool with a high sensitivity (0.76) and specificity (0.93) score. It was also found to have a high Negative Predictive Value (NPV) of 0.87, suggesting that 87% of the patients who scored below 13 points on the BSDS were correctly identified as not having BD. However, the BSDS was found to have a low Positive Predictive Value (PPV) of 0.36. Zimmermann et al. found a NPV as high as 0.98 and a low PPV of 0.16 when using a representative sample size of 1100 outpatients. This PPV score demonstrates a vulnerability to overdiagnosing BD.

In a systematic review and meta-analysis investigating the accuracy of self-report scales for detecting Bipolar Disorder, the BSDS was found to be one of the best performing options along with the Mood Disorder Questionnaire. The BSDS may do better than other scales at detecting different subtypes of bipolar disorder which do not involve a full manic episode, such as bipolar II or cyclothymic disorder.

== Limitations ==
When interpreting results from the BSDS, it has several limitations. The BSDS is an example of a self-report scale which relies on the individual's subjective interpretation of their own symptoms and behaviours. An individual may consciously or subconsciously misrepresent the data due to a range of factors from social desirability bias to faulty recall, which can compromise the accuracy of their BSDS score. An additional limitation is that the scale cannot confirm if an individual has bipolar disorder as it does not include all the signs of bipolar spectrum disorder listed by the DSM-5. A further limitation research studies are often conducted on small samples of outpatients, leading to varying scores of the accuracy and reliability of the BSDS.

All these limitations may play some role in why the BSDS has been found to have such a low PPV, leading to the overestimation of BD in individuals completing the scale. As such, it is important that the BSDS be used in conjunction with other clinical information to make a fully accurate diagnosis, but when used alone, the BSDS can have dangerous ramifications in overdiagnosing a serious psychiatric condition such as bipolar disorder to the general population.

== See also ==
- List of diagnostic classification and rating scales used in psychiatry
- Bipolar disorder
- Rating scales for depression
- Mood Disorder Questionnaire
- Diagnostic and Statistical Manual of Mental Disorders
- ICD-11
