= ASRS =

ASRS may refer to:

- Adventist Society for Religious Studies, a Seventh-day Adventist scholarly community
- Air Sea Rescue Services, the British Second World War air sea rescue organisation, later renamed the RAF Search and Rescue Force
- Amalgamated Society of Railway Servants, a former British trade union
- Automated storage and retrieval system (AS/RS), computer-controlled methods for automatically placing and retrieving loads from specific storage locations
- Aviation Safety Reporting System, the US Federal Aviation Administration voluntary system that allows aircrew to confidentially report near misses and close calls
- Adult ADHD Self-Report Scale, a self-reported questionnaire used to assist in the diagnosis of adult ADHD
