= AGQ =

AGQ may refer to:

- Artland-Gymnasium Quakenbrück, school in Germany
- Aghem language, ISO-639-3 code
- Agrinion Airport, IATA code
- Arian Silver Corporation (TSX Venture Exchange symbol AGQ)
- Archives gaies du Québec (Quebec Gay Archives)
- Assemblies of God Queensland
- Attorney General of Quebec
- Attorney-General of Queensland
- Auditor General of Quebec
- Buss-Perry aggression questionnaire
- ProShares Ultra Silver, NYSE ticker symbol, a silver exchange-traded product

== See also ==
- AG (disambiguation)
