= Childhood Autism Spectrum Test =

Autism screening test for children

- Synonyms: Childhood Asperger Syndrome Test; Social and Communication Development Questionnaire
- LOINC: 62740-6

The Childhood Autism Spectrum Test, abbreviated as CAST and formerly titled the Childhood Asperger Syndrome Test, is a tool to screen for autism spectrum disorder in children aged 4–11 years, in a non-clinical setting. It is also called the Social and Communication Development Questionnaire. Higher scores on this screening test correlate with a higher likelihood of a child being on the autism spectrum.

== Development ==
The questionnaire was developed by the Autism Research Centre at the University of Cambridge, by Fiona J Scott, Simon Baron-Cohen, Patrick Bolton, and Carol Brayne.

=== Pilot study ===
The pilot study utilized data gathered from the CAST completed by parents of 37 neurotypical children and parents of 13 children with an Asperger syndrome diagnosis to determine cut-off scores for this questionnaire. Results revealed that the scores from children with Asperger Syndrome were significantly higher (range 15-31) than the scores of typically developing children (range 0-13). This pilot study helped establish a cut off score of 15 for the CAST, indicating that a child may likely be on the autism spectrum with scores of 15 or higher.

=== Main study ===
There was a low response rate on the CAST questionnaire considering it was sent out to parents of 1,150 primary school aged children but only 199 responses were received. Of those who responded, 174 families accepted to complete the Social Communication Questionnaire (SCQ), a comparison screening tool. The SCQ was based on the Autism Diagnostic Interview-Revised (ADI-R) which was also being utilized for this research study. The results showed that the CAST, compared to other screening tools, may help identify children at risk for autism spectrum disorders in a non-clinical group.

=== Additional research ===
"Research is ongoing to establish validity, reliability, to replicate current findings in a larger and geographically more diverse sample, and to study the epidemiological issues in greater detail." The PhenX Toolkit uses CAST as its child protocol for symptoms of autism spectrum disorders.

The CAST has a sensitivity of 100% and a specificity of 97%. This means that the CAST is able to accurately screen for children who may be on the autism spectrum 100% of the time while also screening out children who may not be on the autism spectrum 97% of the time.

== Format ==
The CAST questionnaire contains 39 yes-or-no questions about the child's social behaviors and communication tendencies. It also contains a separate special needs section that asks about other comorbid disorders that the child might have.

== Strengths & limitations ==
The CAST questionnaire targets children aged 4 to 11 years old, a formative period in development where social and communication skills are improving and solidifying at a rapid pace. Since it is a screening tool used for these ages, it may help address gaps in a child's development and allow a child to get additional support to aid in their development. More positive outcomes in development occur with earlier interventions.

One main limitation of this screening tool is that it may introduce reporting bias since a parent or the main caregiver is the main individual answering questions regarding their child's behavior. Additionally, the time this questionnaire is given may alter the score naturally due to different rates of development in children. It is possible to have confounding factors that may inflate the screening score such as social phobias, tactile and other sensory disturbances, and learning disabilities which may overlap with specific autism traits. In addition to the screening test, these factors should also be assessed separately to ensure it is not an isolated trait. When interpreting scores, the timing of the assessment, living situations, and environmental factors should all be taken into account.

== Autism screening ==
Pediatricians may begin initial screening for autism spectrum disorder (ASD) for their patients at 18 months and 24 months. Special attention may be given to patients who may be at a higher risk for an ASD diagnosis based on family, birth, and developmental history.

The Social Communication Questionnaire (SCQ) is another autism screening tool for children aged 4 years and up. This questionnaire consists of 40 yes or no questions to be filled out by a child's main caregiver based on observed verbal and social skills over the last three months. There is a scoring rubric at the end of the questionnaire that aids a professional clinician to come up with a score based on responses. There is a higher possibility of a child being on the autism spectrum with a score of 15+.

Higher scores on autism screening questionnaires do not automatically lead to a diagnosis of autism. Diagnosis is based on monitoring a child's behavior and development by a professional and meeting standardized criteria found in the American Psychiatric Association's Diagnostic and Statistical Manual, Fifth Edition (DSM-5).

== Recommended interventions ==
The earlier ASD is diagnosed, the earlier treatment can be started to target social, communication, and behavioral skills. Treatment options are based on where a child may fall on the autism spectrum and areas of deficits that may need more attention than others. Appropriate interventions may include a multidisciplinary approach with professionals in different fields, such as behavior analysts, physical therapists, and occupational therapists.

== See also ==
- List of diagnostic classification and rating scales used in psychiatry
