= Autism-Spectrum Quotient =

Psychological questionnaire

- Synonyms: AQ
- LOINC: 62738-0 (Adult version); 62739-8 (Adolescent version)

The Autism-Spectrum Quotient (AQ) is a questionnaire published in 2001 by Simon Baron-Cohen and his colleagues at the Autism Research Centre in Cambridge, UK. Consisting of fifty questions, it aims to investigate whether adults of average intelligence (defined as an IQ of 80 or higher by the questionnaire) have symptoms of autism spectrum disorder. More recently, versions of the AQ for children and adolescents have also been published.

The test was popularised by Wired in December 2001 when published alongside their article, "The Geek Syndrome". The PhenX Toolkit uses age-specific versions of AQ as its adult and adolescent screening protocols for symptoms of autism spectrum disorder.

== Format ==
The test consists of 50 statements, each of which is in a forced choice format. Each question allows the subject to indicate "definitely agree", "slightly agree", "slightly disagree" or "definitely disagree". Approximately half the questions are worded to elicit an "agree" response from neurotypical individuals, and half to elicit a "disagree" response. The subject scores one point for each question which is answered "autistically" either slightly or definitely.

The questions cover five different domains associated with the autism spectrum: social skills; communication skills; imagination; attention to detail; and attention switching/tolerance of change. Factor analysis of sample results have been inconsistent, with various studies finding two, three or four factors instead of five.

== Use as a diagnostic tool ==
In the initial trials of the test, the average score in the control group was 16.4, with men scoring slightly higher than women (about 17 versus about 15). 80% of adults diagnosed with autism spectrum disorder scored 32 or more, compared with only 2% of the control group.

A further research paper indicated that the questionnaire could be used for screening in clinical practice, with scores less than 26 indicating that a diagnosis of Asperger syndrome can effectively be ruled out.

It is also often used to assess milder variants of autistic-like traits in neurotypical individuals.

== Mathematicians, scientists and engineers ==
Although most students with autism spectrum disorder have average mathematical ability and test slightly worse in mathematics than in general intelligence, some are gifted in mathematics and autism spectrum disorder has not prevented adults from major accomplishments, like Nobel Prize winner Vernon L. Smith.

The questionnaire was tried on Cambridge University students and a group of 16 winners of the British Mathematical Olympiad to determine whether there was a link between a talent for mathematical and scientific disciplines and traits associated with the autism spectrum. Mathematics, physical sciences, and engineering students were found to score significantly higher, e.g., 21.8 on average for mathematicians and 21.4 for computer scientists. The average score for the British Mathematical Olympiad winners was 24.

== See also ==
- List of diagnostic classification and rating scales used in psychiatry
- Psychological testing
- Psychometrics
- Autism diagnostic process
