= World Health Organization Composite International Diagnostic Interview =

The World Health Organization Composite International Diagnostic Interview (CIDI) is a structured interview for psychiatric disorders. As the interview is designed for epidemiological studies, it can be administered by those who are not clinically trained and can be completed in a short amount of time. Versions of the CIDI were used in two important studies, the National Comorbidity Survey (NCS) and National Comorbidity Survey Replication (NCS-R) which are often used as a reference for estimates of the rates of psychiatric illness in the USA. The first version of the CIDI was published in 1988, and has been periodically updated to reflect the changing diagnostic criteria of DSM and ICD.

== Short form ==
WHO Composite International Diagnostic Interview – Short Form
- Synonyms: CIDI-SF
- LOINC: 62712-5

The Composite International Diagnostic Interview – Short Form (CIDI-SF) was first published by Ronald C. Kessler and colleagues in 1998, and the PhenX Toolkit uses this as its adult protocol for general psychiatric assessment. However, the CIDI-SF is no longer supported. According to a 2007 memo by Kessler, this decision was based on decreased need for the CIDI-SF following the introduction of other short interviews (specifically, PRIME-MD and MINI) and a lack of funding to refine the instrument.

== See also ==
- Diagnostic classification and rating scales used in psychiatry
