= Ritvo Autism and Asperger Diagnostic Scale =

Psychological self-rating scale

- Purpose: Diagnosis of autism spectrum disorder

The Ritvo Autism & Asperger Diagnostic Scale (RAADS) is a psychological self-rating scale developed by Riva Ariella Ritvo, a professor at the Yale School of Medicine. An abridged and translated 14-question version (RAADS-14) was then developed at the department of clinical neuroscience at the Karolinska Institute, to screen patients who may have undiagnosed ASD.

== Background ==
Autism is often difficult to diagnose in adults due to overlapping symptoms with various other disorders. This can lead to a misdiagnosis or an entirely missed diagnosis of ASD. This poses a challenge to psychiatrists in identifying undiagnosed adults who may have autism. Adults are being referred or self-referred for diagnosis with increasing frequency, making this a useful clinical tool. A score of 64 or more has been shown to be consistent and support a clinical diagnosis, but in the case the clinical diagnosis differs from the test score, the clinical diagnosis should take precedence. Many studies suggest that adults can remain undiagnosed due to the difficulty of gaining an accurate history of the adult's development through childhood, milder presenting or less common traits, and lack of accurate knowledge from medical professionals.

The test itself has been revised and has multiple iterations: RAADS, RAADS-R, and RAADS-14. The RAADS-14 differs most dramatically, consisting of 14 questions organised into three domains: mentalizing deficits, sensory reactivity, and social anxiety. The RAADS-R, revised in 2011 after the original in 2008, has 80 questions organised into four domains: social relatedness, circumscribed interests, language, and sensory-motor symptoms. The test utilises a four-point Likert scale where participants respond to statements by indicating the timing of an experienced behavior or characteristic: "never true", "true only when I was young (before the age of 16)", "true only now", or "true now and when I was young".

== Uses ==
The RAADS-R is free to access, and is often used as a means of self-assessment, taking approximately 10–30 minutes to complete. Ritvo, the creator of the assessment, states that the test as a whole is best utilised as a clinical tool completed with a clinician present. This also allows for direct communication between patient and clinician, which Ritvo states is a valuable addition for diagnostic purposes.

The RAADS-R is available online in English and Swedish and has been translated into various languages for the purpose of assessing its accuracy in identifying ASD, in addition to its performance in comparison to other popular diagnostic tools. When translated for participants in the Netherlands, the RAADS-R correctly identified ASD in 80% of cases, with high sensitivity as opposed to another popular measure, the AQ. The French version of the RAADS-R demonstrates a high standard of validity and reliability in identifying adults who have ASD.

=== Diagnostic accuracy ===
One advantage that the RAADS-R has in comparison to other commonly used autism screening tests is that it has specific questions that target hyposensitivity and hypersensitivity, which correlates with diagnostic criteria in the DSM-5. The RAADS-R is also recommended by the National Institute for Health and Care Excellence, or NICE, which operates within the UK in order to provide nationwide healthcare guidelines. Research conducted in English countries looked at the effectiveness of the RAADS-R test, and found that it was an effective tool in order to expedite a diagnosis with adult mental health services, but should not be used in isolation. Further research published in Autism in the United States found that the test is generally accurate. The participants' age, gender, autism diagnosis, or self diagnosis did not impact how they answered the questions presented.

=== Comorbidities ===
Further uses of the RAADS-R test can be seen with its application to identifying comorbidities, or the existence of multiple disorders with overlapping symptoms that can be identified as symptoms of ASD. The RAADS-R test has been used to assess symptoms of autism present in those with eating disorders, as some studies suggest a possible correlation between eating disorders and ASD. This is due to the overlap and similarities between the two providing common struggles, such as those pertaining to social skills and communication. An Italian version of the test was created to assess a possible correlation and comorbidity between eating disorders and ASD, and found that 33% of patients with eating disorders presented with high ASD traits, with the RAADS-R showing high agreement.

ASD has also been shown to play a role in those with diagnosed bipolar disorder among multiple other comorbidities. This case study revealed another use for the RAADS-R in identifying possible comorbidities, and the repeated likelihood of missed diagnosis in adulthood that can be unearthed using the test, despite frequent symptom overlap.

The RAADS-14, the 14 question version of the test, has been applied to use in New Zealand. Generally it has been proven to be a valid measure, correlating strongly with the Autism Spectrum Quotient, or AQ-10. However, when applied to a New Zealand population, the test has high sensitivity, but not specificity, resulting in a higher number of false positives when solely relying upon test scores. The authors of the above research state a possible improvement to the RAADS-14 through modification of its psychometric properties to suit a particular cultural group.

== Limitations ==
There are a few limitations to the RAADS test that make it important to use alongside professional clinical diagnostic processes. Some limitations may include questions being misinterpreted or misunderstood, unawareness or over-reporting of symptoms, and the same symptoms being rated different levels of "obtrusiveness" in daily functioning.

The RAADS test has only shown moderate accuracy in clinical settings. It has also been shown to require further academic study due to its likelihood of returning a false positive. In an evaluation of the screening effectiveness of the RAADS-R among 50 participants, there was no association between RAADS-R scores and a future clinical diagnosis of autism.

== See also ==
- Diagnostic classification and rating scales used in psychiatry
- Autism
- Asperger syndrome
