= Polysubstance dependence =

Substance use disorder

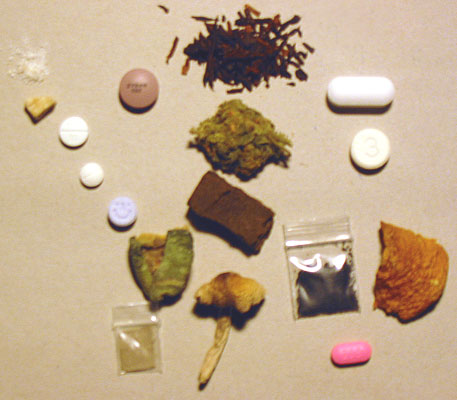
- Psychoactive substances
- Specialty: Psychiatry
- Symptoms: Frequent poly drug use
- Complications: Combined drug intoxication, drug overdose

Polysubstance dependence refers to a type of substance use disorder in which an individual uses at least three different classes of substances indiscriminately and does not have a favorite substance that qualifies for dependence on its own. Although any combination of three substances can be used, studies have shown that alcohol is commonly used with another substance. One study on polysubstance use categorized participants who used multiple substances according to their substance of preference. The results of a longitudinal study on substance use led the researchers to observe that excessively using or relying on one substance increased the probability of excessively using or relying on another substance.

== Common combinations ==
The three substances were cocaine, alcohol, and heroin, which implies that those three are very popular. Other studies have found that opiates, cannabis, amphetamines, hallucinogens, inhalants, and benzodiazepines are often used in combination as well.

== Presentation ==
=== Associated cognitive impairments ===
Cognition refers to what happens in the mind, such as mental functions like "perception, attention, memory, language, problem solving, reasoning, and decision making." Although many studies have looked at the cognitive impairments of individuals who are dependent on one substance, there are few researchers who have tried to determine the problems with cognitive functioning that are caused by dependence on multiple substances. Therefore, what is known about the effects of polysubstance dependence on mental abilities is based on the results of a few studies.

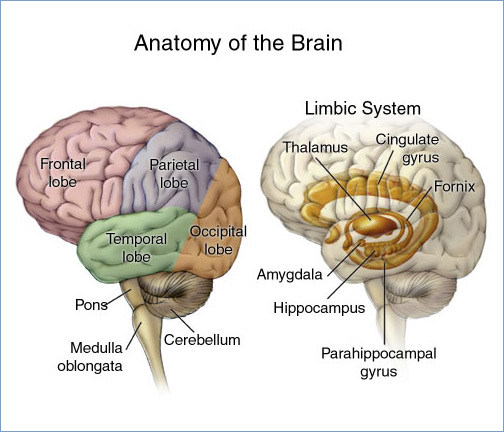

==== Learning ability ====
The effect of polysubstance dependence on learning ability is one area of interest to researchers. A study involving 63 polysubstance dependent women and 46 controls (participants who were not using substances) used the Benton Visual Retention Test (BVRT) and the California Verbal Learning Test (CVLT) to look at visual memory and verbal ability. This study showed that in polysubstance dependent women, verbal learning ability was significantly decreased, though visual memory was not affected. In addition, alcohol and cocaine use led to more severe issues with verbal learning, recall, and recognition.

==== Memory, reasoning and decision making ====
Sometimes studies about specific groups in the general population can be informative. One study decided to test the cognitive abilities of participants in rave parties who used multiple substances. To do this, they compared 25 rave party attenders with 27 control participants who were not using substances. The results of this study indicated that in general, the rave attender group did not perform as well on tasks that tested speed of information processing, working memory, knowledge of similarities between words, ability to attend to a task with interference in the background, and decision making. Certain substances were associated with particular mental functions, but the researchers suggested that the impairments for working memory and reasoning were caused by the misuse of multiple substances.

Another study that tried to find differences between the effects of particular substances focused on people with polysubstance use who were seeking treatment for addictions to cannabis, cocaine, and heroin. They studied a group of people with polysubstance use and a group that was not dependent on any substances. Because alcohol was a common co-substance for nearly all of the people in the polysubstance use group, it was difficult to tell exactly which substances were affecting certain cognitive functions. The researchers found that the difference in the two groups' performance levels on executive function, or higher-level cognitive processing tasks were consistently showing that the polysubstance group scored lower than the control group. In general, this meant that multiple substances negatively affected the polysubstance group's cognitive functioning. More specifically, the researchers found that the amount of cannabis and cocaine affected the verbal part of working memory, the reasoning task, and decision making, while cocaine and heroin had a similar negative effect on visual and spatial tasks, but cannabis particularly affected visual and spatial working memory. These results suggest that the combined use of cannabis, cocaine, and heroin impair more cognitive functions more severely than if used separately.

Alcohol's negative effects on learning, spatial abilities and memory has been shown in many studies. This raises a question: does using alcohol in combination with other substances impair cognitive functioning even more? One study decided to try to determine if people with polysubstance use who also recreationally use alcohol would display poorer performance on a verbal learning and memory test in comparison to those who consumed excessive amounts of alcohol specifically. The California Verbal Learning Test (CVLT) was used due to its ability to "quantify small changes in verbal learning and memory" by evaluating errors made during the test and the strategies used to make those errors. The results of this study showed that the group of people with polysubstance and alcohol use performed poorly on the CVLT recall and recognition tests compared to the group of people who exclusively consumed excessive alcohol only, which implies that polysubstance use impaired the memory and learning in a different way than the effects of alcohol alone can explain.

==== Length of abstinence ====
To examine whether abstinence for long periods of time helps people with polysubstance use recover their cognitive function, a group of researchers tested 207 polysubstance dependent men, of whom 73.4% were dependent on three or more substances. The researchers were interested in six areas of cognitive functioning, which included visual memory, verbal memory, knowledge of words, abstract reasoning, inhibition (interference), and attention. The study used the Benton Visual Retention Test (BVRT) for testing visual memory, the California Verbal Learning Test (CVLT) for verbal memory, the Wechsler Adult Intelligence Scale vocabulary portion for knowledge of words, the Booklet Category Test for abstract reasoning, the Stroop Neuropsychological Screening task for inhibition, and the Trail Making Test for attention. The results showed that neuropsychological ability did not improve with increases in the length of time abstinent. This suggests that polysubstance dependence leads to serious impairment which cannot be recovered much over the span of a year.

== Causes ==
=== Biological ===
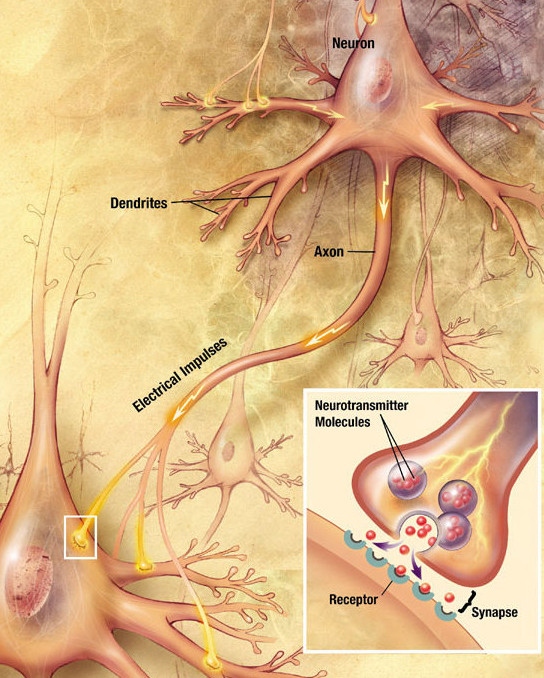

There is data to support that some genes contribute to substance dependence. Some studies have focused on finding genes that predispose the person to be dependent on marijuana, cocaine, or heroin by studying genes that control a person's dopamine and opioid receptors, but no conclusive findings were reported. Other researchers found a connection between dopamine receptor genes and dependency on a substance. A potential problem with this study was that alcohol is commonly used with another substance, so the results of the study may not have been caused by dependency on a single substance. This means that multiple substances may have been contributing to the results, but the researchers suggested that further research should be done.

However, there are studies that have found evidence of the influence of genes on vulnerability to substance dependence. These studies often use genotype, or the genetic information found on a person's chromosomes, and phenotype, which consists of the visible features of a person, to look at genetic patterns. One study examined the phenotype and genotype of 1,858 participants from 893 families to look at differences in three nicotinic acetylcholine receptor genes found within these individuals. The experimenters found significant connections between receptor genes for nicotine and polysubstance dependence, which indicated that differences in these genes can create the risk of being dependent on multiple substances.

=== Psychological ===
A 1985 study conducted by Khantzian and Treece found that 65% of their opioid-dependent sample met criteria for a personality disorder diagnosis. In the same study, 93% of the sample had a comorbid disorder, implying that the comorbid disorder plays some role in the addiction. It has also been shown that depression and polysubstance dependence are often both present at the same time. If a person is genetically predisposed to be depressed then they are at a higher risk of having polysubstance dependence.

Possibly the most widely accepted cause of addictions is the self-medication hypothesis, that views substance addiction as a form of coping with stress through negative reinforcement, by temporarily alleviating awareness of or concerns over the stressor. People who use substances learn that the effects of each type of substance works to relieve or better painful states. They use substances as a form of self-medication to deal with difficulties of self-esteem, relationships, and self-care. Individuals with substance use disorders often are overwhelmed with emotions and painful situations and turn to substances as a coping method.

=== Sociocultural ===
The sociocultural causes are areas in a person's life that might have influenced their decision to start and continue using multiple substances. Sociocultural causes can be divided into social causes and cultural causes.

- Social Causes: Some studies have shown that adolescents have one of the highest rates of polysubstance dependence. According to one study this population, ages 12–25, represents about half of the nation's population that uses illicit substances. Of these individuals, half of them have started using substances by the end of 12th grade. This could be attributed to social expectations of peers, peer pressure to fit in, or a way of numbing their emotions. Some of these young kids start trying different substances initially to fit in, but then after a while they start to develop a tolerance for these substances and experience withdrawal if they don't have enough substances in their system and eventually become dependent on having the effects of substance dependence. With tolerance comes the craving for additional substances to get high, this constant need for that feeling is polysubstance dependence.

In the older generations, polysubstance dependence had been linked to additional considerations such as personality disorder, homelessness, bipolar disorder, major depressive disorder and so on. Medical care being so expensive and difficult to get long term has been linked to polysubstance dependence. Those who need psychological help sometimes use multiple substances as a type of self medication to help manage their mental illnesses.

== Comorbidity of mental disorders ==
For most of these disorders, in relation to polysubstance dependence, there is a vicious cycle that those with a dependence go through. First, ingesting the substance creates a need for more, which creates a dopamine surge, which then creates pleasure. As the dopamine subsides, the pleasure adds to the emotional and physical pain and triggers stress transmitters, which in turn creates a craving, which must then be medicated, and thus the cycle begins again. However, the next time they use, more of the substance will need to be used to get to the same degree of intoxication .

=== Depression ===
Scientists have hypothesized that the use of a substance either causes a mood disorder such as depression or at least attributes to a pre-existing one. Additionally, the substances that people with depression use can be a misguided method of self-medication in order to manage their depression. This is the classic chicken or egg hypothesis, does the pre-existing condition cause dependence or does dependence cause the condition? The underlying mental illness needs to be identified and treated in conjunction with treating the polysubstance dependence in order to increase the success rate of treatment and decrease the probability of relapse. One specific study focused on alcohol and depression, because they are so commonly inter-related. Researchers have discovered that depression continues for several weeks after a patient had been rehabilitated and those who relapsed developed depression again. This means that the onset of depression happens after alcohol dependence occurs, which means that alcohol is a major contributor to depression.

=== Eating disorders ===
One study showed that patients who are recovering from an addiction, who have had an eating disorder in the past, often use food to try to replace the substance that they are no longer getting. Or they obsess over controlling their weight and appearance. Some rehabilitation centers have licensed nutritionists to help patients develop healthy eating habits to help them cope while recovering from their addictions. It is important that those who have a former eating disorder be taught how to eat healthfully, so they don't continuously switch from one addiction back to another.

== Diagnosis ==
According to the DSM-IV, a diagnosis of polysubstance dependence must include a person who has used at least three different substances (not including caffeine or nicotine) indiscriminately, but does not have a preference to any specific one. In addition they must show a minimum of three of the following symptoms listed below, all within the past twelve months. There is a distinct difference between a person having three separate dependence issues and having Polysubstance dependence the main difference is polysubstance dependence means that they are not specifically addicted to one particular substance. This is often confused with multiple specific dependences present at the same time. To elaborate, if a person is addicted to three separate substance such as cocaine, methamphetamines and alcohol and is dependent on all three then they would be diagnosed with three separate dependence disorders existing together (cocaine dependence, methamphetamine dependence and alcohol dependence,) not polysubstance dependence. In addition to using three different substances without a preference to one, there has to be a certain level of dysfunction in a person's life to qualify for a diagnosis of polysubstance dependence. One of the bigger challenges that often occurs when trying to diagnose is the fact that people don't always report what they are taking because they are afraid of getting into legal trouble. When coding polysubstance Dependence in a DSM-IV it would be a multiaxial diagnosis 304.80- Polysubstance Dependence", next to the classification, it is accompanied by a list of other types of Substance dependence (e.g. "305.00 Alcohol Abuse" or "305.60 Cocaine Abuse").

The DSM-IV requires at least three of the following symptoms present during a 12-month period for a diagnoses of polysubstance dependence.

- Tolerance: Use of increasingly high amounts of a substance or they find the same amount less and less effective ( the amount has to be at least 50% more of the original amount needed.)
- Withdrawal: Either withdrawal symptoms when the substance stops being used or the substance is used to prevent withdrawal symptoms.
- Loss of control: Repeated use of more substance than was initially planned or use of the substances over longer periods of time than was planned.
- Inability to stop using: Either unsuccessfully attempted to cut down or stop using the substances or a persistent desire to stop using.
- Time: Spending a lot of time studying substances, obtaining substances, using substances, being under the influence of substances, and recovering from the effects of substances.
- Interference with activities: Give up or reduce the amount of time involved in recreational activities, social activities, and/or occupational activities because of the use of substances.
- Harm to self: Continuous use of substances despite having a physical or psychological problem caused by or made worse by the use of substances.

DSM-5 eliminated polysubstance disorder; there the substances must be specified, among other related changes.

== Treatment ==
Treatment for polysubstance dependence has many critical aspects. Substance rehabilitation is a lengthy and difficult process. Treatment must be individualized and last a sufficient amount of time to ensure the patient has kicked the addictions and to ensure the prevention of relapse. The most common forms of treatment for polysubstance dependence include: inpatient and outpatient treatment centers, counseling and behavioral treatments, and medications. It is important that treatments be carried on throughout the patient's life in order to prevent relapse. It is a good idea that recovering addicts continue to attend social support groups or meet with counselors to ensure they do not relapse.

=== Inpatient treatment center ===
Inpatient treatment centers are treatment centers where addicts move to the facility while they are undergoing treatment. Inpatient treatment centers offer a safe environment where patients will not be exposed to potentially harmful situations during their treatments as they would on the outside. Inpatients usually undergo the process of detoxification. Detox involves withdrawing the user (usually medically) from all substances of concern. During their stay in the treatment facility, patients often are learning to manage and identify their substance addictions and to find alternate ways to cope with whatever is the cause of their addiction.

=== Outpatient treatments ===
Outpatient treatments include many of the same activities offered in an inpatient treatment facility, but the patient is not protected by the secure and safe environment of an inpatient treatment center. For this reason, they are significantly less effective. The patient usually continues to hold a job and goes to treatment nightly.

=== Twelve-step programs ===
Both in-patient and out-patient treatments can offer introductions to Twelve-step programs such as Alcoholics Anonymous and Narcotics Anonymous. They offer regular meetings where members can discuss their experiences in a non-judgmental and supportive place.

=== Cognitive behavioral therapy ===
Also offered to patients are one-on-one counseling sessions and cognitive behavioral therapy (CBT). When looked at through a cognitive-behavioral perspective, addictions are the result of learned behaviors developed through positive experiences. In other words, when an individual uses a substance and receives desired results (happiness, reduced stress, etc.) it may become the preferred way of attaining those results, leading to addictions. The goal of CBT is to identify the needs that the addictions are being used to meet and to develop skills and alternative ways of meeting those needs. The therapist will work with the patient to educate them on their addictions and give them the skills they need to change their cognitions and behaviors. Addicts will learn to identify and correct problematic behavior. They will be taught how to identify harmful thoughts and substance cravings. CBT is an effective treatment for addictions.

=== Medications ===
Medications can be very helpful in the long-term treatment of polysubstance dependence. Medications are a useful aid in helping to prevent or reducing substance cravings. Another benefit of medications is helping to preventing relapse. Since substance use disorders affect brain functioning, medications assist in returning to normal brain functioning. People who use multiple substances require medications for each substance they use, as the current medications do not treat all substance use disorders simultaneously. Medications are a useful aid in treatments, but are not effective when they are the sole treatment method.

=== Substance use Disorder Medications ===
- Methadone treatment for heroin addiction.
- Naltrexone: Reduces opiates and alcohol cravings.
- Disulfiram: induces intense nausea after drinking alcohol.
- Acamprosate: normalizes brain chemistry disrupted by alcohol withdrawal and aids alcohol abstinence.
- Buprenorphine/naloxone: The two medications together reduce cravings and block the pleasure from opiates.

== Epidemiology ==
There are not very many studies that have examined how often polysubstance dependence occurs or how many people are dependent on multiple substances. However, according to a study that analyzed the results from the National Epidemiological Survey on Alcohol and Related Conditions, approximately 215.5 out of a total of 43,093 individuals in the United States (0.5%) met the requirements for polysubstance use disorder. Another study suggested that the number of new cases of polysubstance dependence has been going up. This idea was supported by a study that took place in Munich, Germany. A group of researchers chose to look at responses to a survey using the M-Composite International Diagnostic Interview (M-CIDI). The M-CIDI is a version of the Composite International Diagnostic Interview (CIDI). The researchers collected data from 3,021 participants, all between the ages of 14 and 24, to estimate the prevalence, or total number of cases, of substance use and of polysubstance use/dependence. The results of this study indicated that of the 17.3% who said that they regularly used substances, 40% said that they used more than one substance, but 3.9% specifically reported using three or more substances, indicating that there is a lot of overlap in the use of different substances. The researchers compared their results to earlier German studies and found that substance dependence seems to be increasing, at least in Germany.

=== Gender differences ===
Women and men differ in various ways when it comes to addictions. Research has shown that women are more likely to be polysubstance dependent. It has been noted that a larger percentage of women use licit (legal) substances such as tranquilizers, sedatives, and stimulants. On the other hand, men are more likely to use illicit (illegal) substances such as cocaine, methamphetamine, and other illicit substances. Research suggests that women addicts more frequently have a family history of substance use. When asked to describe their onset of addictions, women more frequently describe their addiction as sudden where as men describe them as gradual. Females have a higher percentage of fatty tissues and a lower percentage of body water than men. Therefore, women absorb substances more slowly. This means these substances are at a higher concentration in a woman's bloodstream. Female addicts are known to be at greater risk for fatty liver disease, hypertension, anemia, and other disorders.

== See also ==
- Self-medication
