= Diagnostic Interview for Genetic Studies =

The Diagnostic Interview for Genetic Studies (DIGS) is a structured interview for psychiatric disorders designed by researchers from the National Institute of Mental Health, first published in 1991. Although most of the diagnoses were based on DSM-III-R criteria, the instrument was also able to generate diagnoses for certain disorders in other systems including DSM-IV, Research Diagnostic Criteria, ICD-10 and Feighner Criteria. This was possible because the instrument records symptoms in sufficient detail to allow different criteria to be applied. The DIGS interview has gone through a number of revisions since being published. The latest version is DIGS 4.0/BP which was published in 2005. All DIGS versions are available to download from the NIMH Center for Collaborative Genomic Studies on Mental Disorders

== See also ==
- Diagnostic classification and rating scales used in psychiatry
