= Screen for child anxiety related disorders =

Screening questionnaire for anxiety disorders

Screen for Child Anxiety Related Emotional Disorders, Revised
- Synonyms: SCARED-R
- LOINC: 62715-8

The Screen for Child Anxiety Related Emotional Disorders (SCARED) is a self-report screening questionnaire for anxiety disorders developed in 1997. The SCARED is intended for youth, 9–18 years old, and their parents to complete in about 10 minutes. It can discriminate between depression and anxiety, as well as among distinct anxiety disorders. The SCARED is useful for generalized anxiety disorder, social anxiety disorder, phobic disorders, and school anxiety problems. Most available self-report instruments that measure anxiety in children look at general aspects of anxiety rather than Diagnostic and Statistical Manual of Mental Disorders (DSM) categorizations. The SCARED was developed as an instrument for both children and their parents that would encompass several DSM-IV and DSM-5 categorizations of the anxiety disorders: somatic/panic, generalized anxiety, separation anxiety, social phobia, and school phobia.

Each question measures the frequency or intensity of symptoms or behaviors. This assessment has been found to be both valid and reliable in research settings.

In 2017 SCARED was adapted to create the Screen for Adult Anxiety Related Disorders (SCAARED). The SCAARED screens for four factors of anxiety related disorders; somatic/panic/agoraphobia, generalized anxiety, separation anxiety, and social anxiety. The SCAARED will be used in longitudinal studies that follow youth into adulthood, as well as studies that compare child and adult populations.

== Versions ==
The SCARED was developed to screen for anxiety disorders in children; there is a parent version as well as a youth self-report version.

The original version developed in 1997 was available in 38 items. The SCARED is most commonly used in the 41-item version published in 1999 which was updated with three additional items in the social phobia scale. There is also a 66-item SCARED-Revised (SCARED-R) that includes the panic disorder, generalized anxiety disorder, social phobia, and separation anxiety disorder scales.

== Reliability ==
Rubric for evaluating norms and reliability for the Screen for Child Anxiety Related Disorders
Criterion	Rating	Explanation
Norms	Good	Multiple research studies of large relevant clinical samples.
Internal consistency (Cronbach's alpha, split half, etc.)	Good	Alphas ranging from .74 to .89
Inter-rater reliability	Not published	No published studies formally checking inter-rater reliability
Test-retest reliability (stability	Adequate	r = .86 over a median of 5 weeks
Repeatability	Not published	No published studies formally checking repeatability

== Validity ==
Evaluation of validity and utility for the Screen for Child Anxiety Related Disorders
Criterion	Rating	Explanation
Content validity	Excellent	Covers DSM diagnostic symptoms for anxiety disorders and specific phobias.
Construct validity (e.g., predictive, concurrent, convergent, and discriminant validity)	Excellent	Shows convergent validity with other symptom scales. SCARED significantly positively correlated with CBCL.
Discriminative validity	Good	AUC of .67, able to discriminate between children with anxiety versus non-anxiety disorders in clinical settings, as well as individual types of anxiety disorders.
Validity generalization	Good	Used in clinical settings for children and adolescents ages 9–18. Reliable across genders and ethnicities. SCARED has been translated into multiple languages with good reliability
Treatment responsivity	Good	Studies show sensitivity to treatment effects when children took the SCARED pre and post treatment suggesting the assessment is effective in both clinical and research settings
Clinical utility	Good	Free (public domain)

== Use ==
The SCARED provides an assessment that detects anxiety disorders in children and differentiates between depression and anxiety and specific anxiety and phobia disorders. The assessment should not be used alone to diagnose a child with an anxiety disorder, however research suggest it is a reliable and useful tool when used along with clinical interviewing diagnose anxiety disorders. The SCARED's treatment sensitivity means that it is useful in both clinical and research settings to measure symptoms and presence of anxiety longitudinally, specifically over the course of treatment. It has proved useful in studying the effectiveness of certain treatments of anxiety disorders in children., however, research founds discrepancies between parent-child agreement warranting further examination of the tool.

=== In other populations ===
Studies of the SCARED also indicate good psychometric properties for children and adolescents of different cultures, distinguishing itself from other similar questionnaires. The SCARED has been found to be a reliable assessment tool in several different cultures and translated into many different languages, including, but not limited to, French, German, Italian, Dutch, Spanish, Chinese, Arabic, and Thai.

== Limitations ==
The assessment tool is limited in that it is a self-report measure, which may introduce bias. Another limitation is that, depending on the age and maturity of the child filling out the questionnaire, they may have difficulty recognizing the frequency or severity of both external and internal symptoms. The parent may also be limited in recognizing the internal symptoms of their child's anxiety.

== Development and history ==
Prior to the development of the SCARED, three widely used rating scales for anxiety in children and adolescents included the Revised Children's Manifest Anxiety Scale, the Revised Fear Survey Schedule for Children, and the Somatic State and Trait Anxiety Scale. While these methods were useful in assessing general anxiety symptoms, they were unable to discriminate between anxiety disorders. To address this shortcoming, the SCARED was developed based on DSM-IV classification to screen specifically for general anxiety disorder (GAD), separation anxiety disorder (SAD), panic disorder, social phobia, and school phobia.

== See also ==
- Diagnostic classification and rating scales used in psychiatry
- Adult SCAARED questionnaire in repository and on author website (note that other languages are available at both the repository and author sites)
- Youth SCARED versions completed by youth or parent version and on author website
