= Barnes Akathisia Scale =

- Synonyms: BARS
- Purpose: assess the severity of drug-induced akathisia

The Barnes Akathisia Scale (commonly known as BAS or BARS) is a rating scale that is administered by physicians and other healthcare professionals to assess the severity of drug-induced akathisia. The Barnes Akathisia Scale is the most widely used rating scale for akathisia. This scale includes objective and subjective items such as the level of the patient's restlessness.

== See also ==
- Diagnostic classification and rating scales used in psychiatry
