= Swanson, Nolan and Pelham Teacher and Parent Rating Scale =

- Purpose: Measure ADHD

The Swanson, Nolan and Pelham Teacher and Parent Rating Scale (SNAP), developed by James Swanson, Edith Nolan and William Pelham, is a 90-question self-report inventory designed to measure attention deficit hyperactivity disorder (ADHD) and oppositional defiant disorder (ODD) symptoms in children and young adults.

Each question measures the frequency of a variety of symptoms or behaviors, in which the respondent indicates whether the behavior occurs "not at all", "just a little", "quite a bit", or "very much". The questionnaire takes about 10 minutes to complete and is designed for use with children and young adults ages 6–18. The questionnaire is currently in its 4th version, and its scores have shown good reliability and validity across multiple different study samples.

== Question breakdown, scoring and interpretation ==
Scoring the SNAP-IV is based on a 0-3 scale, with each question being scored as follows based on participant response:

- 0 points: "not at all"
- 1 point: "just a little"
- 2 points: "quite a bit"
- 3 points: "very much"

=== Domain breakdown ===
The questions measure different domains of ADHD and ODD. The item breakdown is as follows:

- 1-10: Measures attention deficit hyperactivity disorder inattention symptoms
- 11-20: Measures attention deficit hyperactivity disorder hyperactivity/impulsivity symptoms
- 21-30: Measures ODD symptoms
- 31-40: Measures "general childhood problems"
- 41-80: Measures non-ADHD disorders
- 81-90: Measures academic performance and deportment

=== Interpretation of subscale scores ===
Subscale scores add all scores on the items in the subset and divided by the total number of items in the subset. Subscale score cutoffs for the disorders are as follows:

- ADHD inattentive type: Teacher score of 2.56, parent score of 1.78.
- ADHD hyperactive/impulsive type: Teacher score of 1.78, parent score of 1.44.
- ADHD combined type: Teacher score of 2.00, parent score of 1.67.
- ODD: Teacher score of 1.38, parent score of 1.88.

== See also ==
- Vanderbilt ADHD Diagnostic Rating Scale
- Oppositional defiant disorder
