= Hospital Anxiety and Depression Scale =

Self-report mood disorder questionnaire

- Purpose: determine level of anxiety

Hospital Anxiety and Depression Scale (HADS) was originally developed by Zigmond and Snaith (1983) and is commonly used by doctors to determine the levels of anxiety and depression that a person is experiencing. The HADS is a 14-item scale, with seven items relating to anxiety and seven relating to depression. Zigmond and Snaith created this outcome measure specifically to avoid reliance on aspects of these conditions that are also common somatic symptoms of illness, for example fatigue and insomnia or hypersomnia. This, it was hoped, would create a tool for the detection of anxiety and depression in people with physical health problems.

== Items on the questionnaire ==
The items on the questionnaire that relate to anxiety are

- I feel tense or wound up
- I get a sort of frightened feeling as if something awful is about to happen
- Worrying thoughts go through my mind
- I can sit at ease and feel relaxed
- I get a sort of frightened feeling like 'butterflies' in the stomach
- I feel restless as I have to be on the move
- I get sudden feelings of panic

The items that relate to depression are:

- I still enjoy the things I used to enjoy
- I can laugh and see the funny side of things
- I feel cheerful
- I feel as if I am slowed down
- I have lost interest in my appearance
- I look forward with enjoyment to things
- I can enjoy a good book or radio or TV program

== Scoring the questionnaire ==
Each item on the questionnaire is scored from 0-3 and this means that a person can score between 0 and 21 for either anxiety or depression.

== Caseness of anxiety and depression ==
A number of researchers have explored HADS data to establish the cut-off points for caseness of anxiety or depression. Bjelland et al (2002) through a literature review of a large number of studies identified a cut-off point of 8/21 for anxiety or depression. For anxiety (HADS-A) this gave a specificity of 0.78 and a sensitivity of 0.9. For depression (HADS-D) this gave a specificity of 0.79 and a sensitivity of 0.83.

== Factor structure ==
There are a large number of studies that have explored the underlying factor structure of the HADS. Many support the two-factor structure but there are others that suggest a three or four factor structure. Some argue that the tool is best used as a unidimensional measure of psychological distress.

== Criticisms ==
The factor structure of the HADS has been questioned. Coyne and Sonderen argue in a letter published in the same issue, that Cosco, et al. provides grounds for abandoning HADS altogether. The HADS has also been criticised for its over reliance on anhedonia as being the core symptom of depression, how single-item measures of depression may have the same predictive value as the HADS scale, as well as its use of British colloquial expressions which can be difficult to translate.

== See also ==
- Diagnostic classification and rating scales used in psychiatry
