= Minnesota Borderline Personality Disorder Scale =

Psychiatric scale

The Minnesota Borderline Personality Disorder Scale (MBPD) is a measure of borderline personality disorder traits. The scale was created in 2011 by and uses items from the Multidimensional Personality Questionnaire, an instrument commonly included in large longitudinal data sets, so that such past studies can be reanalyzed to study borderline personality disorder.
