= Mini-international Neuropsychiatric Interview =

Clinical interview format

The Mini-international Neuropsychiatric Interview (MINI) is a short structured clinical interview which enables researchers to make diagnoses of psychiatric disorders according to DSM-IV or ICD-10. The administration time of the interview is approximately 15 minutes and was designed for epidemiological studies and multicenter clinical trials.

== See also ==
- Diagnostic classification and rating scales used in psychiatry
