= Wender Utah Rating Scale =

Self-reported questionnaire used to assist in the diagnosis of ADHD in adults

The Wender Utah Rating Scale (WURS) is a psychological assessment tool used to help diagnose attention deficit hyperactivity disorder (ADHD) in adults. It is a self-report questionnaire that asks individuals to retrospectively recall and rate the frequency and severity of symptoms they experienced during childhood that are characteristic of ADHD. The assessment was released in 1993 after being developed by Paul H. Wender and his colleagues at the University of Utah School of Medicine.

== Versions ==
The WURS exists in two main versions:

- WURS-61: The original 61-item version, which covers a wider range of symptoms and potential confounding factors.
- WURS-25: A shorter 25-item version designed for increased efficiency and ease of administration.

=== Translations ===
The WURS-61 and the condensed WURS-25 have been translated into several languages, including French, Italian, Spanish, Bulgarian, Swedish, Chinese, Turkish, and Persian.

In 2002, a modified German short form of the WURS, WURS‑K (Kurzversion; also WURS‑G) was released. This 21-item scale shares 17 items with the WURS-25.

== Scoring ==
The Wender Utah Rating Scale (WURS) scores the same set of 25 questions in both the abbreviated version (WURS-25) and the extended version (WURS-61), which includes an additional 36 unscored questions. Respondents rate each question on a five-point Likert scale ranging from 0 points ("not at all or very slightly") to 4 points ("very much"). The cumulative score spans from 0 to 100. A cutoff score of 36 or higher was able to accurately identify 96% of adults with ADHD and 96% of adults without ADHD. When the cutoff score was raised to 46 or higher, the assessment was able to accurately identify 86% of adults with ADHD and 99% of adults without ADHD.

For the German short form (WURS-K), a cutoff score of 30 or higher is typically used to indicate a childhood history of ADHD symptoms, demonstrating a retest reliability of 90%. While the WURS-K and WURS-25 are highly correlated, research indicates that their cutoff scores are not directly interchangeable due to the WURS-K containing fewer items and focusing more on antisocial behavior compared to the mood and self-esteem factors found in the WURS-25.

== See also ==
- Diagnostic classification and rating scales used in psychiatry
