= Combined drug intoxication =

Cause of death by drug overdose from poly drug use

Combined drug intoxication (CDI), or multiple drug intake (MDI), is a cause of death by drug overdose from poly drug use, often implicated in polysubstance dependence.

== Risk factors ==
People who engage in polypharmacy are at an elevated risk of death from CDI. Other dangers of combining drugs such as "brain damage, heart problems, seizures, stomach bleeding, liver damage/ liver failure, heatstroke, coma, suppressed breathing, and respiratory failure", along with many other complications. Disorders like depression and anxiety can also stem from polydrug use. Elderly people are at the highest risk of CDI, because of having many age-related and health problems requiring many medications combined with age-impaired judgment, leading to confusion in taking medications. Elderly patients are often prescribed more than one drug within the same drug class, and doctors may treat the side effects of prescribed drugs with even more drugs, which can overwhelm the patient.

== Prevention ==
In general, the use of multiple drugs should be carefully monitored by a qualified individual such as board certified and licensed medical doctor, either an MD or DO. Close association between prescribing physicians and pharmacies, along with the computerization of prescriptions and patients' medical histories, aim to avoid the occurrence of dangerous drug interactions. Lists of contraindications for a drug are usually provided with it, either in monographs, package inserts (accompanying prescribed medications), or in warning labels (for OTC drugs). CDI/MDI might also be avoided by physicians requiring their patients to return any unused prescriptions. Patients should ask their doctors and pharmacists if there are any interactions between the drugs they are taking.

== Prevalence ==
In 2004, there were 3,800 deaths in the US resulting from a fatal medication error involving alcohol, while in 1983 there were fewer than 100 such deaths. It is more of a risk for older patients.

== Common combinations ==
=== Alcohol ===
Alcohol can exacerbate the symptoms and may directly contribute to increased severity of symptoms. The reasons for toxicity vary depending on the mixture of drugs. Usually, most victims die after using two or more drugs in combination that suppress breathing, and the low blood oxygen level causes brain death.

== See also ==
- List of deaths from drug overdose and intoxication
- Adverse drug reaction
- Pharmacovigilance
