= Weinberg Screen Affective Scale =

Weinberg Screen Affective Scale (WSAS)
- Purpose: screens for depression in those 5-21 of age

The Weinberg Screen Affective Scale (WSAS) is a free scale designed to screen for symptoms of depression in children and young adults ages 5–21. It can be used as an initial treatment scale and can be used to follow up on treatment efficacy. There are 56 self-report questions that screen for symptoms in 10 major categories of depression: dysphoric mood, low self-esteem, agitation, sleep disturbance, change in school performance, diminished socialization, change in attitude towards school, somatic complaints, loss of usual energy, and unusual change in weight and/or appetite. The scale is based on previously proposed criteria for depression in children. A study looking at the agreement between scales for depression diagnosis found 79.4% agreement between the DSM-III and the WSAS in a sample of 107 children.

The test is a 56-item self-report test to be completed by the child or young adult that takes an average of 3–5 minutes to complete. Each question describes a symptom and the respondent circles either "yes" or "no" if the symptom applies. The WSAS is written at a fourth-grade level in order to get better results. To go along with this, the definitions of behaviors were made very clear and to the point. The purpose of the two forms (adult and child) is to help clinicians more readily recognize depression in children who have been failing in school, have done poorly in the home, and will allow other school personnel to be more cognizant of depression symptoms in students. Based on research, the WSAS has been found both reliable and valid.

== Psychometrics ==
Some questions have different validities depending on the patient's ethnic background. As a result, one limitation of the scale is its validity across different cultures. Furthermore, this measure may not be valid in measuring suicidal tendencies in adolescents.
