= Polysubstance use =

Use of multiple psychoactive substances

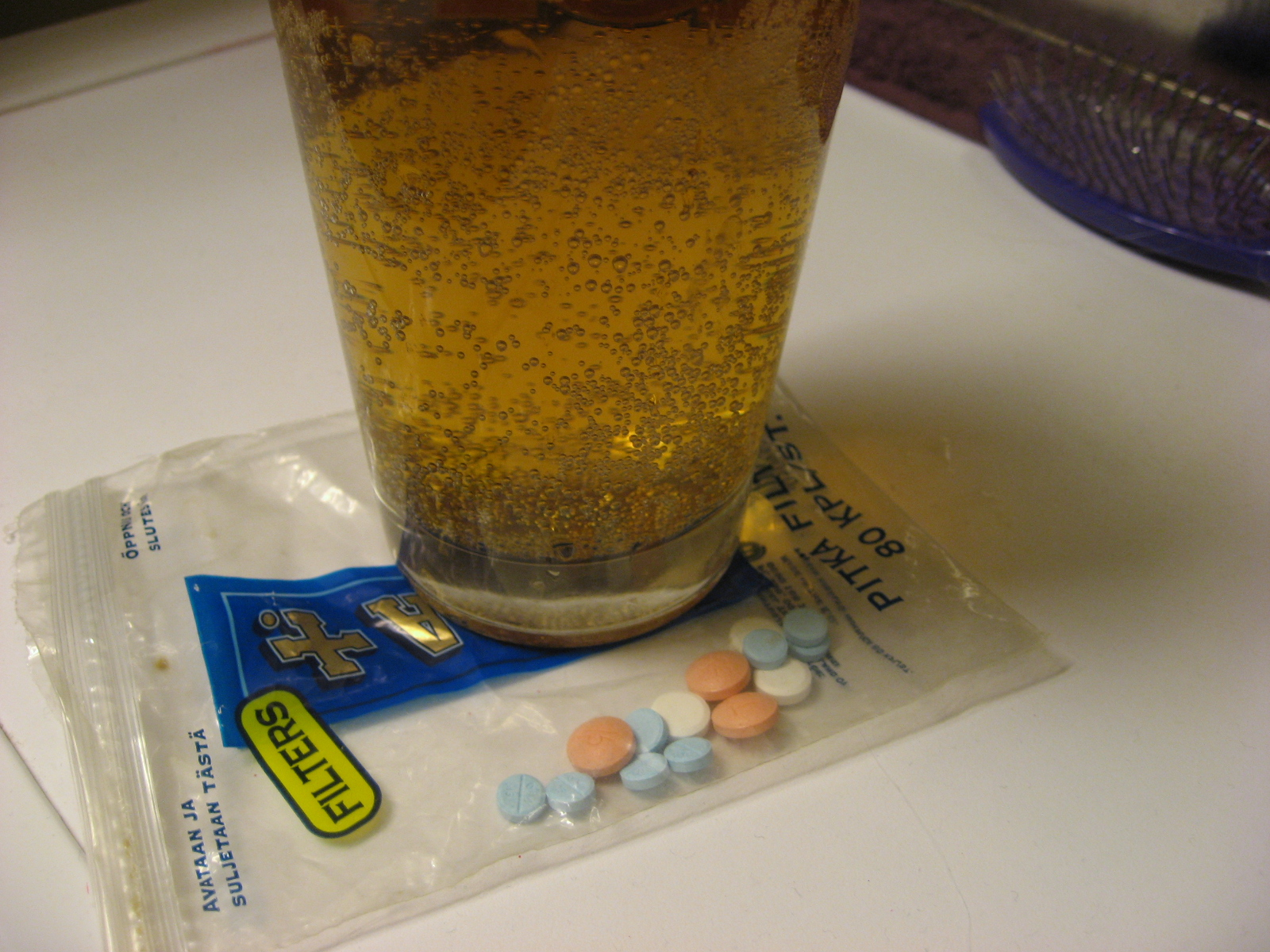
- Tranquillizers, sleeping pills, opiates and alcohol. Opioid-related deaths often involve alcohol.
- Specialty: Psychiatry
- Complications: Combined drug intoxication, drug overdose

Polysubstance use or poly drug use refers to the use of combined psychoactive substances. Polysubstance use may be used for entheogenic, recreational, or off-label indications, with both legal and illegal substances. In many cases one drug is used as a base or primary drug, with additional drugs to leaven or compensate for the side effects, or tolerance, of the primary drug and make the experience more enjoyable with drug synergy effects, or to supplement for primary drug when supply is low.

== Drug combination ==
Some ingredients such as caffeine, creatine and β-alanine are found in nearly all pre-workout blends, but each branded product is a "proprietary blend" with an average of 18 different ingredients, the exact composition and proportions of which can vary widely between different products. Additionally legal psychoactive substances occasionally used in these proprietary blends that are typically legal include 5-HTP, tyrosine, and yohimbine. Although these products are not banned, the Food and Drug Administration warns consumers to be cautious when consuming pre-workout.

Benzodiazepines can cause death when mixed with other CNS depressants such as opioids, alcohol, or barbiturates. Alcohol and cocaine (for example coca wine) increase cardiovascular toxicity. Opioids or cocaine taken with ecstasy or amphetamines also result in additional acute toxicity.

== Scheduling ==
Within the general concept of multiple drug use, several specific meanings of the term must be considered. At one extreme is planned use, where the effects of more than one drug are taken for a desired effect. Another type is when other drugs are used to counteract the negative side effects of a different drug (e.g. depressants are used to counteract anxiety and restlessness from taking stimulants). On the other hand, the use of several substances in an intensive and chaotic way, simultaneously or consecutively, in many cases each drug substituting for another according to availability.

== Research ==
The phenomenon is the subject of established academic literature. A study among treatment admissions found that it is more common for younger people to report polysubstance use.

== See also ==
- Alcohol licensing laws of the United Kingdom
- Ban on caffeinated alcoholic drinks in the United States
- Counterfeit drug
- Designer drug
- Drug checking
- Drug overdose
- Gateway drug theory
- Harm reduction
- Illegal drug trade
- Mickey Finn (drugs)
- Over the counter drug
- Pharmacology
- Polysubstance dependence
- Psychopharmacology
- Psychotomimetism
- Purple drank
- Reagent testing
- Recreational drug use
- Responsible drug use

== Bibliography ==
- Martin, Christopher S.; Chung, Tammy; Langenbucher, James W. (2017). "Part 1: Defining and Characterizing the Nature and Extent of Substance Use Disorders – Historical and Cultural Perspectives on Substance Use and Substance Use Disorders". In Sher, Kenneth J. (ed.). The Oxford Handbook of Substance Use and Substance Use Disorders: Volume 1. Oxford Library of Psychology. Oxford and New York: Oxford University Press. pp. 27–59. doi:10.1093/oxfordhb/9780199381678.013.001. ISBN 978-0-19-938167-8. LCCN 2016020729.
- Anthony, James; Barondess, David A.; Radovanovic, Mirjana; Lopez-Quintero, Catalina (2017). "Part 1: Psychiatric Comorbidity – Polydrug Use: Research Topics and Issues". In Sher, Kenneth J. (ed.). The Oxford Handbook of Substance Use and Substance Use Disorders: Volume 2. Oxford Library of Psychology. Oxford and New York: Oxford University Press. pp. 27–59. doi:10.1093/oxfordhb/9780199381708.013.006. ISBN 978-0-19-938170-8. LCCN 2016020729.
- Hernández-Serrano, Olga; Gras, Maria E.; Font-Mayolas, Sílvia; Sullman, Mark J. M. (2016). "Part VI: Dual and Polydrug Abuse – Chapter 83: Types of Polydrug Usage". In Preedy, Victor R. (ed.). Neuropathology of Drug Addictions and Substance Misuse, Volume 3: General Processes and Mechanisms, Prescription Medications, Caffeine and Areca, Polydrug Misuse, Emerging Addictions and Non-Drug Addictions. Cambridge, Massachusetts: Academic Press, imprint of Elsevier. pp. 839–849. doi:10.1016/B978-0-12-800634-4.00083-4. ISBN 978-0-12-800634-4.
