= Autism Research Centre =

Research institute

The Autism Research Centre (ARC) is a research institute that is a part of the Department of Psychiatry at the University of Cambridge, England.

ARC's research goal is to understand the biomedical causes of autism spectrum conditions, to evaluate promising interventions for autistic people, and to improve the health and well-being of autistic people and their families. The ARC collaborates with scientists both within Cambridge University and at universities in the UK and around the world. Professor Simon Baron-Cohen is the director of the ARC and Professor of Developmental Psychopathology at the University of Cambridge, as well as being a Fellow of Trinity College, Cambridge.

== See also ==
- Childhood Autism Spectrum Test, an Autism Spectrum screening tool developed at the ARC
- Spectrum 10K, the UK's largest study of autistic people, led by Simon Baron-Cohen under the aegis of the ARC
