= Buss–Perry Aggression Questionnaire =

- Purpose: assessment of aggression

The Buss–Perry Aggression Questionnaire (also known as the Aggression Questionnaire and sometimes referred to as the AGQ or AQ) was designed by Arnold H. Buss and Mark Perry, professors from the University of Texas at Austin in a 1992 article for the Journal of Personality and Social Psychology.

== History and development ==
The AQ was meant to be an improvement from a previous scale developed by Arnold H. Buss in 1957 with Ann Durkee which measured different types of interpersonal hostility, called the Buss-Durkee Hostility Inventory. The scales and items of the Hostility inventory were developed following observations in clinical psychology situations, with limited statistical analysis. As a result, when factor analysis was conducted to verify the seven scales conceptualized in the test, no research results supported such findings. Additionally, the Hostility inventory also suffered from reliability issues. These problems were rectified in the AQ. Several items in the AQ were taken from the Hostility inventory, and factor analysis on the items, which were tested on more than 1,000 college students, resulted in four factors.

In 2000, the AQ underwent further development which expanded its factors into five, with indirect aggression as the addition. The number of items also greatly increased from the original 18 items. This new version has been validated on more than 2,000 people, including children and elderly.

== Test format ==
Though the 2000 version of the AQ, which was developed by Arnold H. Buss and W. L. Warren exists, the 1992 version is still widely used. Below are the differences between the two tests.

=== Buss–Perry Aggression Questionnaire (1992) ===
The 1992 version of the AQ is a 29-item questionnaire in which participants rank certain statements along a 5-point continuum from "extremely uncharacteristic of me" to "extremely characteristic of me". The scores are normalized on a scale of 0 to 1, with 1 being the highest level of aggression. It measures four factors: physical aggression, verbal aggression, anger, and hostility.

=== Buss-Warren Aggression Questionnaire (2000) ===
The 2000 version of the AQ consists of 34 items measuring five factors: physical aggression, verbal aggression, anger, hostility, and indirect aggression. It uses a 5-point Likert scale, just like the 1992 version, though the description of the response scales are changed into "not at all like me" and "completely like me".

== Usage ==
The final version of the AQ is meant for usage in normal populations starting from the age of 9 until 88 years old. It has also been used in adults with mental illnesses. Several versions of the AQ has been validated for use in Japan, Argentina, China, and the Netherlands.

== See also ==
- List of diagnostic classification and rating scales used in psychiatry
