= S. Nassir Ghaemi =

American psychiatrist

- Born: 1966 (age 59–60); Tehran, Iran

Academic background
- Education: George Mason University (BA); Virginia Commonwealth University (MD); Tufts University (MA); Harvard University (MPH)

Academic work
- Discipline: Psychiatrist
- Institutions: Harvard Medical School
- Notable works: A First-Rate Madness; Clinical Psychopharmacology
- Website: http://www.nassirghaemi.com/

Seyyed Nassir Ghaemi (born 1966) is an American academic psychiatrist, author, and adjunct professor of psychiatry at Emory University School of Medicine, as well as lecturer on psychiatry at Harvard Medical School. He has previously held faculty positions at Tufts University, George Washington University, and other institutions. He has authored multiple books on psychopathology, psychopharmacology, and the philosophy of psychiatry. He is particularly interested in psychiatric classification and bipolar mood illness.

Ghaemi has authored over 300 articles in the scientific literature. He is a proponent of the concept of manic-depressive illness in the original Kraepelinian sense; an advocate for lithium therapy, which he views as underutilized; and a critic of the DSM diagnostic system for its emphasis on reliability of diagnosis over scientific validity.

His writings consistently underscore the importance of accurate diagnosis and methodological pluralism to understand the complexities of mental life. He cites as his mentors Leston Havens, Elvin Semrad, and Karl Jaspers, among others.

Ghaemi is among the most recognizable and widely cited psychiatrists of his generation. According to his Google Scholar profile, his work has been cited over 20,000 times.

== Life and Career ==
Ghaemi immigrated to the United States at the age of 5 from Tehran, Iran, and attended McLean High School in McLean, Virginia. He received his B.A. from George Mason University in 1986 and later a medical degree from Medical College of Virginia. He then went on to receive an M.A. in philosophy from Tufts University in 2001, where he studied with Daniel Dennett, and an M.P.H. from the Harvard School of Public Health in 2004. He completed his residency training at the Massachusetts General Hospital and McLean Hospital, both affiliates of Harvard Medical School.

Ghaemi served as Director of the Mood Disorder Program and the Psychopharmacology Consultation Clinic at Tufts Medical Center and maintains a small, independent private practice. In 2025, he completed a term as President of the Massachusetts Psychiatric Society.

He is the founder of The Psychiatry Letter, "a community of clinicians who want to practice in a scientific and humanistic way, focusing on research data, not the conventional wisdom." It was founded as a digital and print newsletter in 2016 and now is a website that provides webinars and free educational information for clinicians, patients, and families.

Ghaemi is a frequent contributor to Psychiatric Times, where he co-writes a column titled Concepts in Psychiatry.

== Works ==
- Letters to a Medical Student, and other essays
- Clinical Psychopharmacology: Principles and Practice
- On Depression: Drugs, Diagnosis, and Despair in the Modern World
- A First-Rate Madness: Exploring the Links between Mental Illness and Leadership
- The Rise and Fall of the Biopsychosocial Model: Reconciling Art and Science in Psychiatry
- A Clinician's Guide to Statistics and Epidemiology in Mental Health: Measuring Truth and Uncertainty
- Mood Disorders: A Practical Guide
- The Concepts of Psychiatry: A Pluralistic Approach to the Mind and Mental Illness
- Polypharmacy in Psychiatry
