= Child and Adolescent Symptom Inventory =

Behavioral rating checklist

- Purpose: assess ADHD (among other disorders)

The Child and Adolescent Symptom Inventory (CASI) is a behavioral rating checklist created by Kenneth Gadow and Joyce Sprafkin that evaluates a range of behaviors related to common emotional and behavioral disorders identified in the Diagnostic and Statistical Manual of Mental Disorders (DSM), including attention deficit hyperactivity disorder, oppositional defiant disorder, conduct disorder, generalized anxiety disorder, social phobia, separation anxiety disorder, major depressive episode, mania, dysthymic disorder (pervasive depressive disorder in DSM-5), schizophrenia, autism spectrum, Asperger syndrome, anorexia, and bulimia. In addition, one or two key symptoms from each of the following disorders are also included: obsessive-compulsive disorder, specific phobia, panic attack, motor/vocal tics (uncontrolled sudden, repetitive movements or sounds), and substance use. CASI combines the Child Symptom Inventory (CSI) and the Adolescent Symptom Inventory (ASI), letting it apply to both children and adolescents, aged from 5 to 18. The CASI is a self-report questionnaire completed by the child's caretaker or teacher to detect signs of psychiatric disorders in multiple settings. Compared to other widely used checklists for youths, the CASI maps more closely to DSM diagnoses, with scoring systems that map to the diagnostic criteria as well as providing a severity score. Other measures are more likely to have used statistical methods, such as factor analysis, to group symptoms that often occur together; if they have DSM-oriented scales, they are often later additions that only include some of the diagnostic criteria.

== Overview ==
The number of items in the inventory vary by version, but all versions report four separate scores:

- Symptoms count scores which reflect symptoms that are evident and reflect a DSM diagnosis
- Symptom's severity scores that create T scores using normative data-severity scores range from 0 (never) to 3 (very often), and are viewed by a clinician as clinically significant if happening often (2) or very often (3)
- Impairment scores for each sub-category in order to determine the degree to which symptoms for each disorder interfere with functioning in both social and academic settings
- Clinical cutoff scores that compare the symptom count score and impairment score

There are both parent and teacher versions, completed by each, that are submitted to the professional working with the youth at his/her appointment. It is important to acquire information from both of these sources because there are different demands placed on youth in different environments and the different settings bring out different aspects of symptoms for different disorders. Furthermore, one care provider may be better at accurately evaluating symptoms in the youth over others. Lastly, knowing the different settings in which the symptoms manifest in the youth is essential in adapting the most successful treatment plan. The teacher version differs from the parent version in many ways. The main difference is the addition of items that address information regarding behavior in educational settings as well as academic performance to the teacher version. Furthermore, the teacher version excludes disorders that develop primarily in the home setting (i.e., separation anxiety, oppositional defiant disorder), as well as items in the parent checklist that the teacher would be unable to answer (i.e., regarding sleep, eating habits, activity at night). In order to compare the versions most accurately, the teacher version was not renumbered, but instead excludes the items that don't pertain to it. The wording of both version's was made user friendly by replacing psychiatric jargon of the DSM with more easily understood phrases by the care providers.

== Versions ==
- CASI-4R: This is the original version of the CASI, which combines the CSI-4 and ASI-4 to derive symptom counts that map to behavioral and emotional disorders in the DSM-IV for children and adolescents ages 5 to 18.
  - Parent/Caregiver version:142 items, 8 pages
  - Teacher version: 105 items, 7 pages
  - Research version: 163 items
    - This version is used by longitudinal projects (lots of discussion of do we follow the new criteria because 10 years of data asking it the other way; in general longitudinal projects do no not want to switch halfway through; used by LAMS;
- CASI-5: This version was created in 2013 to include the changes made from the DSM-IV to the DSM-5 and therefore replaces the CASI-4R, however it does include all of the items from the CASI-4R. Changes/additions include the addition of new disorders, as well as changes in names of disorders, symptoms, and scoring for some disorders. The new disorders added to this version include disruptive mood dysregulation disorder, avoidance/restrictive food intake disorder, binge eating disorder, and social communication disorder.
    - Parent/Caregiver-context of the home: 173 items, 8 pages
    - Teacher version-context of school: 125 items, 7 pages

== Development and history ==
The CASI began as two separate measures that were developed to assist clinicians in obtaining information about youths from their caregivers. Although a variety of checklists were already available, most were not clearly connected to the diagnostic system used by psychiatry and many other professions. The authors saw this need and began to create a symptom checklist in 1984 that was based on the third edition of the Diagnostic and Statistical Manual of Mental Disorders (DSM). Their goal was to obtain information about children who were receiving special education services so that they could assign them into groups based on their learning and behavioral problems that were more relevant to conventional psychiatric diagnoses (need citation). In this way, the measures helped gather information that helped the clinician form a diagnostic impression. The items also rated the severity of the symptoms. Adding them created a severity score that help guide selection of treatment targets. The original motivation for developing the checklist was to aid with research and gathering of fairly large amounts of data in schools; however, the creators soon saw the possible application of these symptom inventories in clinical settings. To that end, they began work in 1986 on an instrument that would be used by teachers and parents to give a comprehensive look at a youth's emotional and behavioral symptoms. This led to the earliest measure related to the CASI- the Stony Brook Child Symptom Inventory-3 (CSI-3). In 1987 this was followed by the CSI-3R based on the revised third edition of the DSM (DSM-III-R). The CSI-3R included both teacher and parent checklists. The teacher checklist focused on youth behaviors more likely take place in a school setting. In 1990, Dr. Gabrielle Carlson adapted the parent checklist from the CSI-3R for use with adolescents, which became the first version of the Adolescent Symptom Inventory (ASI-3R). After the fourth edition of the DSM was published in 1994, the CSI-4 was developed in response to those changes. The CSI-4 was available in both Spanish and English. In 1995, the ASI was also updated to the ASI-4 to account for modifications in the DSM.

== Impact ==
The inventories provide a low cost way of gathering information efficiently and organizing it in a way that maps to diagnostic classifications.

The checklists also make it straightforward to collect and compare information from multiple informants. Teachers and parents oftentimes spend much more time with the youth than the clinician does. There are both parent and teacher checklists available. Clinicians can look at both the Symptom Count scores and the Symptom Severity scores and analyze them in order to determine whether or not it surpasses the Clinical Cutoff score.

The assessment can be used to measure symptoms over the course of treatment. The CASI-PM, also known as the assessment's progress monitor, is a facet of the inventory that is used to both monitor and analyze certain outstanding symptoms to see if there are disorders that are comorbid with other disorders that already exist within the patient. Thus, this part of the inventory can be used to track change in symptoms as the child or adolescent develops.

== Use in other populations ==
The most recent version of the inventory has thus far only been used in the United States. The YI-4, the ECI-4, the CSI-4 and the ASI-4 are all available in the Spanish language. According to the website, the creators of the inventory intend to make it even more accessible by translating it into more languages.

== Limitations ==
The assessment is commercially distributed; see details on the official website. Published versions are currently limited to English and Spanish language. The changes made to DSM-5 required some alterations in content and scoring of the CASI. Because it is so new, less research is available about the version that corresponds with the DSM-5.

== See also ==
Other checklists for assessing emotional and behavioral problems in children and adolescents are:

- Achenbach System of Empirically Based Assessment
- Strengths and Difficulties Questionnaire
