= Diagnostic Interview for ADHD in Adults =

ADHD assessment tool

The Diagnostic Interview for ADHD in Adults (DIVA) is a semi-structured interview tool designed to evaluate attention deficit hyperactivity disorder (ADHD). Developed by J.J.S. Sandra Kooij and M.H. Francken, it is based on the diagnostic criteria outlined in the Diagnostic and Statistical Manual of Mental Disorders (DSM). The DIVA is widely used in both clinical practice and research settings to assist in the diagnosis of ADHD and to evaluate ADHD symptoms and their impact on various aspects of life.

== History ==
J.J.S. Kooij and M.H. Francken led a team in the Netherlands that initially developed the Diagnostisch Interview Voor ADHD (DIVA). Its creation aimed to address the need for a standardized diagnostic instrument for ADHD in adults that was both accessible and cost-effective. The first versions of the DIVA underwent a testing period of seven months, during which several hundred patients were assessed at the PsyQ Adult ADHD Program in the Netherlands. Feedback provided by clinicians and patients was used to refine the tool, leading to the release of the final Dutch language version in August 2007.

In 2009, as interest in the DIVA grew, it began to be translated into other languages. The translations were managed to ensure linguistic and cultural accuracy. Experienced clinicians in various countries reviewed the initial translations to align them with local psychiatric practices. Back-translations into Dutch were then verified before the final versions were authorized. The DIVA was updated in 2010 with the release of DIVA 2.0, which included additional symptom examples and an improved introduction to enhance clarity. This version adhered to the diagnostic framework of the DSM-IV.

A revised version, DIVA-5, was released in 2019 to reflect updates in the DSM-5. Changes in the DIVA-5 included an adjustment of the criterion for onset age from "before seven years of age" to "before twelve years of age," in line with DSM-5 standards. Additionally, the number of symptoms required for an adult ADHD diagnosis was lowered from six to five in both the inattention and hyperactivity/impulsivity domains. The classification of ADHD subtypes was also revised, with "subtypes" being redefined as "clinical presentations" due to the lack of stability in subtype categorization over the course of the disorder.

Adaptations of the DIVA-5 include the Young DIVA-5, for children and adolescents aged 5–17, and the DIVA-5 ID, for individuals with intellectual disabilities.

== Structure and content ==
The DIVA is organized into three main sections that correspond to the DSM criteria for ADHD. The first section evaluates symptoms of inattention, such as forgetfulness, difficulty focusing, and organizational challenges. The second section examines hyperactivity and impulsivity symptoms, including restlessness, impulsive behavior, and difficulty remaining seated. The third section assesses the age of onset and functional impairments caused by ADHD symptoms.

The DIVA-5 evaluates all eighteen DSM-5 criteria for ADHD, covering both childhood and adulthood, and assesses impairments in five key areas of functioning: education, work, social relationships, leisure activities, and family or partner relationships. Each symptom is illustrated with specific examples derived from clinical observations and accounts provided by individuals with ADHD. These examples aim to contextualize the criteria within everyday life and how the symptoms of ADHD manifest in both childhood and adulthood. The presence of impairments in at least two domains is required for a diagnosis.

The DIVA-5 encourages incorporating collateral information from informants, such as partners or family members, to provide additional perspectives and corroboration, particularly on childhood behavior. When collateral information is unavailable, the diagnosis relies on the individual's self-report and clinical judgment. The DIVA typically takes about 90 minutes on average to complete.

== Translations ==
The DIVA-5 has been translated into more than 25 languages; however, only three translations (Korean, Persian, and Italian) have undergone formal validation. The Korean version demonstrated a diagnostic accuracy of 92%, with a sensitivity of 91.30% and a specificity of 93.62%. The Persian version showed diagnostic agreement rates of 81.66% between DIVA-5 and SCID-5, 80% between SCID-5 and CAARS-S-SV, and 71.66% between DIVA-5 and CAARS-S-SV, with good to excellent reliability. A validation study of the Italian version, conducted with 132 participants, reported internal consistency with Cronbach's alpha values ranging from 0.61 to 0.78. The study found statistically significant correlations between the DIVA-5 and other established ADHD diagnostic tools, supporting its reliability and validity for assessing ADHD in adults.
