= The Mood and Feelings Questionnaire =

Survey that measures depressive symptoms in children and young adults

- Purpose: measure depressive symptoms

The Mood and Feelings Questionnaire is a survey that measures depressive symptoms in children and young adults. It was developed by Adrian Angold and Elizabeth J. Costello in 1987, and validity data were gathered as part of the Great Smoky Mountain epidemiological study in Western North Carolina. The questionnaire consists of a variety of statements describing feelings or behaviors that may manifest as depressive symptoms in children between the ages of 6 and 17. The subject is asked to indicate how much each statement applies to their recent experiences. The Mood and Feelings Questionnaire has six versions, short (13 item) and long (33 item) forms of each of the following: a youth self-report, a version that a parent would complete, and a self-report version for adults. Several peer-reviewed studies have found the Mood and Feelings Questionnaire to be a reliable and valid measure of depression in children. Compared to many other depression scales for youth, it has more extensive coverage of symptoms and more age-appropriate wording and content.

== Scoring and interpretation ==
The Mood and Feelings Questionnaire has several tests, one short and one long, with the short questionnaire including 13 questions and the long questionnaire consisting of 33 questions. Scoring of the questionnaire works by summing the point values allocated to each question. The responses and their allocated point values are as follows:

"not true" = 0 points

"somewhat true" = 1 point

"true" = 2 points

Scores on the short Mood and Feelings Questionnaire range from 0 to 26, whereas scores on the long version range from 0 to 66. Higher score are indicative of increased depressive symptom severity. Scores larger than 12 on the short version or larger than 27 on the long version are suggestive of likely depression and warrant further clinical assessment.

== Validity ==
The Mood and Feelings Questionnaire, along with the Short Mood and Feelings Questionnaire, shows reasonable psychometric properties for identifying children in early adolescence with a depressive disorder. Secondly, it does not significantly differentiate between children with depression versus children with anxiety disorders. Finally, the questionnaire has been translated into Arabic, Spanish and Norwegian, but testing of these versions is more limited.

== Limitations ==
Questionnaires like the Mood and Feelings Questionnaire should not act as a substitute for thorough clinical evaluations for both the child and parent.
