= Vanderbilt ADHD Diagnostic Rating Scale =

Psychological assessment tool

Vanderbilt ADHD diagnostic rating scale
- Purpose: measure ADHD in children

The Vanderbilt ADHD Diagnostic Rating Scale (VADRS) is a psychological assessment tool for attention deficit hyperactivity disorder (ADHD) symptoms and their effects on behavior and academic performance in children ages 6–12. This measure was developed by Mark L Wolraich at the Oklahoma Health Sciences Center and includes items related to oppositional defiant disorder, conduct disorder, anxiety, and depression, disorders often comorbid with ADHD.

There are two versions available: a parent form that contains 55 questions, and a teacher form that contains 43 questions. Shorter follow-up versions of the VADRS are also available for parents and teachers and consists of 26 questions with an additional 12 side effect measures. Comparing scores from the different versions of the VADRS with other psychological measures have suggested the scores have good but limited reliability and validity across multiple samples.. The VADRS has only been recently developed, however, so clinical application of the measure is limited.

== Development and history ==
The VADRS was developed by Wolraich with the aim to add common comorbid conditions associated with ADHD that was lacking from previous assessments. As public awareness of ADHD has increased, epidemiological studies have found a prevalence rate of 4–12% in children of ages 6–12 throughout the United States. Not only is ADHD the most commonly encountered childhood-onset disorder in neurodevelopment, there is also a high comorbidity rate linking ADHD with other behavioral, emotional and learning problems and disabilities. As a need to obtain a defined population sample due to a lack of funds, Wolraich developed the teacher VADRS. The teacher rating scales are important, because current diagnostic guidelines require that symptoms of ADHD be seen in more than one setting before making a diagnosis.

== Scoring and interpretation ==
Both parent and teacher assessment scales have two components: symptom assessment and impairment in performance. The symptom assessment component screens for symptoms relevant to inattentive and hyperactive ADHD subtypes. To meet criteria for ADHD diagnoses, one must have 6 positive responses to either the core 9 inattentive symptoms or core 9 hyperactive symptoms, or both.

Both the parent and the teacher versions ask the respondent to rate the frequency of a child's behaviors on a 0–3 scale as follows:

- 0: "never";
- 1: "occasionally";
- 2: "often";
- 3: "very often".

A positive response is either a score of 2 or 3 ("often" to "very often").

The final 8 questions of both versions ask the respondent to rate the child's performance in school and his or her interactions with others on a 1–5 scale, with 1–2 meaning "above average", 3 meaning "average", and 4–5 meaning "problematic".

To meet the criteria for ADHD, there must be at least one score for the performance set that is a 5, or two scores that are at least 4, as these scores indicate impairment in performance.

=== Parent version ===
The parent version of the Vanderbilt ADHD Diagnostic Rating Scale contains 6 subscales. Behaviors are included in the total for each subscale if they are scored as a 2 or a 3. The rules for scoring are as follows:

- ADHD inattentive type: Must score either a 2 or 3 on six or more items in questions 1–9, and score of 1 or 2 on any items in the performance section.
- ADHD hyperactive/impulsive type: Must score either a 2 or 3 on six or more items in questions 10–18, and a score of 1 or 2 on any items in the performance section.
- ADHD combined type: Meets criteria for both ADHD inattentive type and hyperactive/impulsive type.
- Oppositional defiant disorder (ODD): Must score either a 2 or a 3 on four or more items in questions 19–26.
- Conduct disorder: Must score either a 2 or 3 on three or more items in questions 27–40.
- Anxiety/depression: Must score either a 2 or 3 on three or more items in questions 41–47.

=== Teacher version ===
The teacher version of the Vanderbilt ADHD Diagnostic Rating Scale contains 5 subscales. Behaviors are included in the total for each subscale if they are scored as a 2 or a 3. A score of 1 or 2 on at least one question in the performance section indicates impairment. The rules for scoring are as follows:

- ADHD inattentive type: Must score either a 2 or 3 on six or more items in questions 1–9.
- ADHD hyperactive/impulsive type: Must score either a 2 or 3 on six or more items in questions 10–18.
- ADHD combined type: Meets criteria for both ADHD inattentive type and hyperactive/impulsive type.
- Oppositional defiant disorder (ODD): Must score either a 2 or a 3 on three or more items in questions 19–28.
- Anxiety/depression: Must score either a 2 or 3 on three or more items in questions 29–35.

== Reliability ==
Rubric for evaluating norms and reliability for the Vanderbilt ADHD Diagnostic Rating Scale (Note: Table from Youngstrom et al. extending Hunsley & Mash, 2008.)
Criterion	Rating (adequate, good, excellent, too good (Note: New construct or category.))	Explanation with references
Norms	TBD	Norms have been collected for large samples of children in elementary school with the teacher version, but norms for a clinical sample have not been reported.
Internal consistency (Cronbach's alpha, split half, etc.)	Good	Cronbach's alpha was over .90 for all of the subscales in many studies.
Inter-rater reliability	TBD	A meta analysis reported low inter-rater reliability between the parent and teacher VADRS scores, but more research is needed to analyze inter-rater reliability for the relatively new VADRS.
Test-retest reliability	Adequate	A meta analysis conducted by Bard, who extrapolated data, demonstrated that the test-retest reliability exceeded .80 for all summed scale scores in elementary school children populations with a time span of about a year.
Test-repeatability	TBD	Data has not been collected for test repeatability.

== Validity ==
Evaluation of validity and utility for the Vanderbilt ADHD Diagnostic Rating Scale
Criterion	Rating (adequate, good, excellent, too good)	Explanation with references
Content validity	Good	The VADRS contains items typical of ADHD measures that are also based on DSM-IV criteria in addition to items relating to other behaviors and disorders likely in children such as general school functioning and conduct disorder.
Construct validity (e.g., predictive, concurrent, convergent, and discriminant validity)	Good	Both the parent and teacher versions of the VADRS have shown high concurrent validity with similar measures with anxiety subscales like the C-DISC-IV in clinical and non-clinical samples.
Discriminative validity	Good	The VADRS showed good sensitivity (.80) and adequate specificity (.75) compared to diagnoses based on a structured interview with some corroboration by teachers.
Validity generalization	Adequate	Published data on the VADRS were mostly from Oklahoma, so more research is needed to observe the measure's use in different settings and with different demographics. The samples were carefully constructed and analyzed, though.
Treatment sensitivity	TBD	No sources cited yet.
Clinical utility	Good	The National Institute for Children's Health Quality and the American Academy of Pediatrics recommend it, and it has become widely used.

== Impact ==
There is a high comorbidity of learning disorders (LDs) in children with ADHD, and for that reason the VADRS has been studied to determine if the performance item questions on the VARS can reliably predict if the child with ADHD has a comorbid LD (e.g. math, reading, spelling LDs). Results of a receiver operating characteristic (ROC) analysis show that children with ADHD can be reliably ruled out from have a comorbid LD based on the performance items on the VARS. This is clinically useful because it allows those without LDs to be ruled out and therefore reduce the amount of unnecessary referrals to healthcare professionals.

== Limitations of the first edition ==
At the time of publication, the VADRS was a fairly new instrument. Test standardization procedures had been completed on a limited range of populations, normative data were only developed for the teacher version, and the comorbidity subscales were not based on the DSM-IV. The current incarnation of the VADRS, now in its third edition, has been adapted for DSM-5 criteria.

== See also ==
- Attention deficit hyperactivity disorder
- Oppositional defiant disorder
- Major depressive disorder
- Generalized anxiety disorder
