= Zung Self-Rating Depression Scale =

- Purpose: assess level of depression

The Zung Self-Rating Depression Scale was designed by Duke University psychiatrist William W.K. Zung MD (1929–1992) to assess the level of depression for patients diagnosed with depressive disorder.

- 20–44 Normal Range
- 45–59 Mildly Depressed
- 60–69 Moderately Depressed
- 70 and above Severely Depressed

The Zung Self-Rating Depression Scale has been translated into many languages, including Arabic, Azerbaijani, Dutch, German, Portuguese, and Spanish.

== See also ==
- Diagnostic classification and rating scales used in psychiatry
- Zung Self-Rating Anxiety Scale
