= Adult ADHD Self-Report Scale =

Self-reported questionnaire used to assist in the diagnosis of ADHD in adults

- LOINC: 62750-5

The Adult ADHD Self-Report Scale (ASRS) Symptom Checklist is a self-reported questionnaire used to assist in the diagnosis of adult ADHD. Attention Deficit Hyperactivity Disorder is a neurological disorder that can present itself not only in childhood, but also adolescence and adulthood. Adults with ADHD may experience difficulties in relation to cognitive, academic, occupational, social and economic situations.

ADHD is a neurodevelopmental disorder that can present itself in adolescence and adulthood. Adults with ADHD may experience difficulties in relation to cognitive, academic, occupational, social and economic situations. Several types of ADHD can present in Adults including inattentive ADHD, Hyperactivity, Impulsive ADHD, and Combined type. Inattentive types have difficulty to paying attention to details and make careless mistakes. Hyperactive type may talk a lot or have behavior issues. Impulsive types might also act out or interrupt conversations. Combined type have a combination of symptoms.

ADHD has no single cause but can be genetically inherited in many cases, and roughly 76% of those diagnosed inherited it from their parent(s). For the remaining percentage of individuals, 14-15%, ADHD may have been caused due to their environment, such as trauma in the womb or during birth. Changes in the genes that influence the neurochemicals serotonin, dopamine, and norepinephrine levels can cause them to be overactive or under active, possibly playing a role in the development of an individual with ADHD. It has also been shown that activity in the frontal lobe is decreased in an individual with ADHD compared to an individual without ADHD. The Adult ADHD Self-Reporting Scale (ASRS) was created to estimate the pervasiveness of an adult with ADHD in an easy self survey.

The ASRS was developed in conjunction with the World Health Organization (WHO), and the Workgroup on Adult ADHD which included researchers from New York University Medical School and Harvard Medical School. The ASRS has eighteen questions, which are consistent with the DSM-IV criteria and address ADHD symptoms in adults. The six question ASRS Screener was later developed as a subset of the WHO's eighteen question ASRS. At least one study has found that the six question ASRS Screener outperformed the eighteen question ASRS in diagnosing ADHD in the general population.

ASRS has been translated to other languages including Spanish and Chinese. Conducted research proved that the scale is a valid and useful tool for the screening of adult ADHD. The ASRS was externally validated on approximately 60 adult patients, and showed high internal consistency and high concurrent validity with the physician-administered ADHD rating system.

== Development and history ==
Self-rating scales are generally useful tools because they create a way to collect a large, accurate amount of data in an organized, quick, and cost effective way. The diagnostic criteria originally designed for determining whether an individual was experiencing ADHD symptoms was designed for children. These criteria has been criticized for being limiting for adults and the symptoms that may be found in adults with ADHD such as procrastination, poor motivation, and time management difficulties.

=== Scoring ===
The ASRS has two versions, the ASRS v1.1 is a DSM-4 measure, and has a simple scoring mechanism in which the total score correlates to likelihood of positive diagnosis and severity. The ASRS-5 is a DSM-5 measure, which has a proprietary weighted scoring algorithm.

Both versions of the Adult Attention-Deficit/Hyperactivity Disorder Self-Reporting Rating Scale (ASRS) are composed of 18 questions. Each question can be answered on a five item Likert scale, based on a scale of frequency ranging from "Never" to "Very Often". Each column is used to describe the severity of the individuals symptoms based on the question asked. The participant is asked to make a mark within one column for each question that best describes their answer. The questions are split up into two separate parts; Part A consists of questions 1–6, which comprises a screener, and Part B consists of questions 7–18; together parts A and B comprise a symptoms checklist.

== Applications ==
The Adult ADHD Self Report Scale is used to test the probability of adults, (18 years and older), having ADHD.

=== Reliability/Validity ===
There have been studies done to test the validity and reliability of the ASRS by comparing results of participants that were diagnosed with childhood ADHD, after completing the self reporting on their own and then were subsequently tested with a clinician. There was high correlation between the grouped symptoms (hyperactivity/impulsiveness and inattentiveness) when comparing the administration results of the tests. After an experiment with 60 adults, who completed the self rating scale and whose results were compared to their ratings with an administered ADHD rating scale, the results showed that the self rating scale has a high internal reliability and also validity.

=== Limitations ===
The Adult ADHD Self-Report Scale is only applicable for adults who may or may not be diagnosed or undiagnosed with ADHD. A positive screening is not a proper diagnosis, but an indication that the adult should seek a healthcare professional for further analysis. Although the 6 question ASRS screener can be effective in diagnosing ADHD in adults and can be completed quickly, it cannot rule out other medical conditions that could be impacting the diagnosis of ADHD. Some symptoms of ADHD do contain some overlap with other mood disorders, which are not tested for within the ASRS. Other limitations, such as paying attention to possible comorbid conditions, along with a history of each individual who takes this questionnaire, and those who struggle with substance abuse issues, need to be taken into consideration when comparing their results to the scale. Keeping in mind that the symptoms must be ongoing, these symptoms cannot be considered indicators of ADHD if they've only been present for the past few months or even years.

== See also ==
- Diagnostic classification and rating scales used in psychiatry
