= PhenX Toolkit =

American medical website

The PhenX Toolkit
- Screenshot
- Website type: Content Site
- Available in: English
- Owner: NHGRI
- Creator: RTI International
- Website: www.phenxtoolkit.org
- Commercial: no
- Registration: Optional
- Users: 3700+ Registered, 1.6M+ visits
- Launched: 6 February 2009
- Current status: Active
- Content license: Public Domain

The PhenX Toolkit is a web-based catalog of high-priority measures related to complex diseases, phenotypic traits and environmental exposures. These measures were selected by working groups of experts using a consensus process. PhenX Toolkit's mission is to provide investigators with standard measurement protocols for use in genomic, epidemiologic, clinical and translational research. Use of PhenX measures facilitates combining data from a variety of studies, and makes it easy for investigators to expand a study design beyond the primary research focus. The Toolkit is funded by the National Human Genome Research Institute (NHGRI) of the National Institutes of Health (NIH) with co-funding by the Office of the Director (OD), the National Institute of Neurological Disorders and Stroke (NINDS), and the National Heart, Lung, and Blood Institute (NHLBI). Continuously funded since 2007, PhenX has received funding from a variety of NIH institutes, including the National Institute on Drug Abuse (NIDA), the National Institute on Mental Health (NIMH), the National Cancer Institute (NCI) and the National Institute on Minority Health and Health Disparities (NIMHD). The PhenX Toolkit is available to the scientific community at no cost.

For genome-wide association studies (GWAS) and other studies involving human subjects, the use of standard measures can facilitate cross-study analyses. Such analyses compare independent findings to validate results or combine studies to increase sample size and statistical power. This increased power makes it possible to identify more subtle and complex associations such as gene-gene and gene-environment interactions. PhenX is an NIH Common Data Element (CDE) Repository project and supports the NIH Strategic Plan for Data Science, which promotes FAIR principles (i.e., Findable, Accessible, Interoperable, Reusable) to facilitate data sharing.

In 2020, PhenX collaborated with the U.S. NIH's Public Health Emergency and Disaster Research Response Program (DR2) to collect and review research protocols for epidemiologists, clinicians and other scientists studying COVID-19. The Toolkit released six specialty collections of protocols to promote the use of CDEs for research on COVID-19 in October 2020.

== See also ==
- Patient-Reported Outcomes Measurement Information System
- Health informatics
- REDCap (Research Electronic Data Capture)
- LOINC
