= Doctor of Education =

Doctoral degree

The Doctor of Education (Ed.D or DEd; Latin Educationis Doctor or Doctor Educationis) is a research doctorate or professional doctorate in the field of education. It prepares the holder for academic, research, administrative, clinical, or professional positions in educational, civil, private organizations, or public institutions. Considerable differences exist in structure, content and aims between regions.

== History ==
The history and roots of the Ed.D are in the United States. Other countries or regions have adopted or developed the award, often following different conventions and with different structures. This section, therefore, concerns the United States; for some other regions, information can be found under the regional headings below.

When research universities were established in the late 19th century in the United States, they primarily awarded doctorates in the sciences and later the arts. By the early 20th century, these universities began to offer doctoral degrees in professional fields. The first professional degrees were awarded in medicine and law. Shortly thereafter, in response to the societal demand for expert practitioners, doctorates began to be awarded in education. The first Doctor of Philosophy (Ph.D.) degree in the field of education was granted at Teachers College, Columbia University in 1893. The first Doctor of Education (Ed.D.) degree was granted at Harvard University in 1921. Henry Holmes, an educator at Harvard College, raised funds to establish the Harvard Graduate School of Education. Holmes saw value in increasing Harvard's role in the professional training of educators and established doctorate of education, or Ed.D., for students who had had a successful teaching experience, possessed a "working knowledge of biology, psychology, and the social sciences", and who sought a higher position within the school system. The program of study comprised five areas of education plus the study of social theory in education, history of education, and educational psychology. The dissertation served to teach the student to conduct an independent investigation utilizing existing knowledge and producing a "constructive result of importance and value". The purpose of the Ed.D. was to offer a rigorous course of study that would enhance candidates’ prior knowledge and skills and better prepare them to lead as school practitioners.

The EdD degree was then added by Teachers College in 1934. Between 1925 and 1940 many institutions, including the University of California-Berkeley, Stanford University, and the University of Michigan followed the steps of Columbia and Harvard and established schools and colleges of education that offered graduate study and eventually, the two doctoral degrees. Despite this growth, however, these and other schools of education struggled to establish their identity as professional schools and were perpetually engulfed in debate over the purpose of the Ed.D.

The history of the Ed.D. throughout the 20th century was one of confusion. In many graduate schools of education it was a practitioner degree, while in others it was considered education's research doctorate. Several factors contributed to the confusion: First, offering two doctoral degrees resulted in constant conflict between the "demands of theory and those of practice". Second, the advancement of professional training was further complicated as schools of education competed with schools of arts and sciences. Graduate programs in arts and sciences were older and more established. Traditionally arts and science faculty offered doctoral preparation in the form of the Ph.D. Both the school of arts and sciences and its faculty had difficulty relinquishing their expertise in doctoral studies or in acknowledging the need for a professional doctoral degree. Third, from the inception of both doctoral degrees in education, unclear goals and similar programmatic content have confused the degree purposes and plagued professionalization efforts.

The Ed.D. is awarded in several countries (see below).

== Australia ==
In Australia, entry requirements for the Ed.D. are similar to the Ph.D. except that the former requires a number of years professional experience in education or academia.

== Canada ==
In Canada, the Ed.D. tends to be granted by faculties of education at Universities and is a terminal degree in education. Much like the United States and Great Britain, some universities offer the Ed.D. (Simon Fraser University), while others offer a Ph.D. in education (McGill University, Queen's University, University of Toronto, University of Manitoba, University of New Brunswick), and still others offer both (Ontario Institute for Studies in Education at the University of Toronto, The University of Western Ontario, University of Alberta, University of Calgary, University of British Columbia).

Much like the UK, in Canada, the Ed.D. is a full academic doctorate that can only be granted by AUCC-accredited institutions and shares equal parity with a Ph.D. (Education). The dissertation to be completed as part of an Ed.D. program differs only in focus but not in breadth of study, nor academic rigour required. Ed.D. programs in Canadian institutions must include an original contribution to knowledge which must be chaired (supervised) by an accomplished researcher and orally defended (viva) to internal and external examiners. In many cases, the only salient difference between the Ph.D. and Ed.D. relates to the professional field of practice of the candidate as Ed.D. programs often tend to focus on existing pedagogical problems.

== India ==
In India, universities recognized by the U.G.C. can award a Ph.D. in education. Students who have cleared the NET (Education) exam have to choose a guide enlisted by the university. Students who do not pass the NET exam must qualify by taking an exam conducted twice by every university. NET-cleared students are given preference over those not qualified by the NET.

== Ireland ==
In Ireland, Ed.D. programs have only recently been introduced. They tend to follow the UK model of initial research modules followed by longer research papers and thesis.

== Singapore ==
In Singapore, the National Institute of Education (Nanyang Technological University) is the sole university that awards the Ed.D. degree. The Ed.D. programme has the rigour and expectations of a Ph.D., but with a professional focus.

== South Africa ==
In South Africa, following a convention of using Latin in academic designations, the doctorate in education is called Doctor Educationis (D.Ed.) and, like other doctoral degrees in that country, it is entirely a research-based qualification.

== United Kingdom ==
In the United Kingdom, the Ed.D. is a terminal research degree that is equivalent to the Ph.D., both which can only be granted by universities with research-degree awarding powers.

The Ed.D. usually involves courses and a dissertation, but as with all doctorates requires at least a dissertation. The Ed.D. thesis may be shorter than that of the Ph.D., because the Ed.D. normally includes coursework that includes assessed papers, whereas Ph.D. programs of study are focused on undertaking a thesis without such coursework. The Ed.D. thesis differs from a Ph.D. thesis only in length and scope but not in quality. As with Ph.D. candidates, all Ed.D. candidates undergo a viva voce examination (comprehensive oral defence of one's thesis/dissertation).

The EdD is generally presented as an opportunity to prepare for academic, administrative or specialised positions in education, placing the graduates for promotion and leadership responsibilities, or high-level professional positions in a range of locations in the broad Education industry. Both the Ed.D. and Ph.D. are recognised for the purposes of appointment as a lecturer or professor in universities.

In 1991, the Doctor of Education programme at the University of Bristol began and was the first taught doctorate outside of North America. The Ed.D. is delivered through a balance of taught units including research methods, theory, argumentation and evaluation skills as well as a major research thesis that must make an original contribution to knowledge. As with other doctoral candidates, participants of the Ed.D. are encouraged to publish articles and books based on their research. An excellence in doctoral level research is the main aim of the Bristol Ed.D.

At the Institute of Education in London, the Ed.D. "is for experienced professionals from education and related fields who would like to extend their professional understanding and develop skills in research, evaluation and high-level reflection on practice". Meanwhile, the PhD "is intended to enable [students] to produce [their] own thesis and to develop a range of research and other more generic skills."

The University of Cambridge's Faculty of Education provides a useful comparison between the Ph.D. and Ed.D. programmes for their particular university.

== United States ==
In the United States, the Ed.D. tends to be granted by the school of education of universities and is a terminal degree in education. Majors within the Ed.D. may include: counseling, curriculum and instruction/curriculum and teaching, educational administration, education policy, educational psychology, educational technology, higher education, human resource development, language/linguistics, leadership or technology/innovation in instruction. The Ed.D. is recognized for appointment as a professor or lecturer in a university. It may also be recognized as preparation for administrative positions in education and human development field, such as superintendent of schools, human resource director, or principal.

From the very beginning, there was a formal division between the Ed.D. and the Ph.D. in education, and the growing popularity of the applied doctorates was met by faculty in the arts and sciences questioning their legitimacy. They argued that practical and vocational aims were inappropriate for doctoral study, which they contended should be focused on producing scholarly research and college professors. The EdD and the colleges of education that granted them continued to face criticism through the 1980s. In 2013, Harvard University, the first institution to award the Ed.D. degree, accepted its last Ed.D. cohort and instead now offers both the Doctor of Philosophy in Education and the Doctor of Educational Leadership (Ed.L.D.) degrees.

=== Comparisons of the Ed.D. to the Ph.D. in education in the United States ===
There are similarities between the Ed.D. and Ph.D. which may cause confusion. In theory, the two degrees are expected to constitute overlapping but distinct categories, where the Ed.D. is a degree that prepares educational practitioners who can solve educational problems using existing knowledge, and the Ph.D. in education is the more theoretical of the two as a traditional social science research degree that prepares students for careers as scholars and academics, often from a particular disciplinary perspective (e.g., sociology of education). In reality, however, distinctions between the two degree programs are generally minimal in both curriculum and dissertation requirements. One study on dissertations submitted between 1950 and 1990 indicated that there were no differences between the two degrees regarding basic versus applied research or the significance of the findings. Nonetheless, that same study indicated that "Ph.D. dissertations contained more multivariate statistics, had wider generalizability, and were more prevalent in certain areas of concentration", whereas "Ed.D. dissertations contained more survey research and were most prevalent in educational administration research." The difference is attributed primarily to which type of degree a particular school offers and if existing research or original research is required in the dissertation.

The Carnegie Project on the Education Doctorate (CPED) states that "the professional doctorate in education prepares educators for the application of appropriate and specific practices, the generation of new knowledge, and for the stewardship of the profession." To wit, although the CPED describes the Ed.D. as a professional doctorate, it also states that it prepares students for the generation of new knowledge, and this is corroborated by the fact that both the Ph.D. and Ed.D. degrees are considered research doctoral degrees on the Survey of Earned Doctorates, which is a survey conducted by the National Opinion Research Center at the University of Chicago, sponsored by six federal agencies, and solicited, under the National Science Foundation Act, from graduating doctoral students at all accredited institutions.

Colleges and universities in the United States that offer doctorates in education choose to offer only the Doctor of Education (e.g. Webster University), only the Doctor of Philosophy in education (e.g., Stanford University), or both (e.g., UCLA, University of Missouri, and University of Pennsylvania). The distinction between the Ph.D. and the Ed.D. in this last group can take different forms. At the University of Illinois, for example, the Ph.D. in education dissertation requires an original contribution to academic knowledge, whereas the EdD dissertation "is intended to demonstrate the candidate's ability to relate academic knowledge to the problems of professional practice." At Teachers College, Columbia University the PhD is designed for students who wish specifically to pursue an academic career, whereas the Ed.D. is designed for broader aims including educational administration and policy work. In St. Louis University's Educational Studies program, the Ed.D. requires "successful completion of a culminating project dealing with a problem in educational practice" and the Ph.D. requires a dissertation and an "oral defense of the dissertation proposal and [of] the final dissertation. Most Ed.D., Psy.D. and Ph.D. programs require a dissertation and an oral defense while others have a research project leading to publication as an alternative." Finally, some schools frame the Ed.D. specifically in terms of applied research, such as New York University, The University of Texas at Austin, and the University of California, Berkeley.

In addition to educational settings, the Ed.D. degree is designed to address real-world issues including clinical mental health counseling and human resource development.

=== Criticism ===
Lee Shulman, President of the Carnegie Foundation for the Advancement of Teaching, stated that the lack of distinction between the Ed.D. and the Ph.D. has meant the Ed.D. has come to be seen as little more than "Ph.D.-lite", and the Ph.D. in education has likewise suffered. Moreover, it has resulted in "the danger that we achieve rigorous preparation neither for practice nor for research." Arthur Levine, former president of Teachers College, Columbia University, said that the Ed.D. degree is granted to both scholars and administrators and as such makes the degree ambiguously defined, that the programs in educational leadership specifically suffered from low standards, and that "There is absolutely no reason why a school leader needs a doctorate." Barbara K. Townsend, Professor of Higher Education and Associate Dean for Research and Development at the University of Missouri at Columbia, suggests the doctorate of education is most frequently sought for vanity purposes and to improve one's status, citing a 2000 survey of California school superintendents in which they identify the greatest value of the Ed.D. as being its "symbolic value (credibility and respects a basis for leadership)", further adding that there is scant research or evidence to suggest that possession of a doctorate in education improves one's ability to be an effective administrator.

=== Suggestions for reform ===
Some scholars in the United States have suggested future reforms for both the Ed.D. and Ph.D. in education by calling for a new doctorate for the professional practice of education, which would be for principals, superintendents, policy coordinators, curriculum specialists, teacher educators, program evaluators, etc.; and the distinction between the Ph.D. in education and the Ed.D. would be analogous to the distinction between the Ph.D. in biomedicine and the M.D. This new degree might be called the Professional Practice Doctorate (PPD), or it might retain the old name of Ed.D. but be severed from old associations.

Arthur Levine argued that the current Ed.D. should be retooled into a new professional master's degree, parallel in many ways to the Master of Business Administration (MBA).

David Imig described reforms to the Ed.D. as including more collaborative work involving the analysis of data collected by others. Rather than generating their own data and hypothesis-testing, as Ph.D. students would, a group of Ed.D. students would analyze a specific pool of data from a number of different angles, each writing an individual dissertation on a specific aspect of the data which, when pooled together with the other dissertations, would combine to offer a comprehensive solution to a real-world problem.

The Carnegie Project on the Education Doctorate is currently working with over 80 institutions to collaboratively redesign the Ed.D. and "to make it a stronger and more relevant degree for the advanced preparation of school practitioners and clinical faculty, academic leaders and professional staff for the nation’s schools and colleges and the learning organizations that support them".

Reforms have already been implemented at some institutions. For example, in 2013 the Harvard University Graduate School of Education enrolled its final Ed.D. cohort. The school now offers the Doctor of Education Leadership (Ed.L.D.) and Ph.D. in Education.

== Notable doctors of education ==
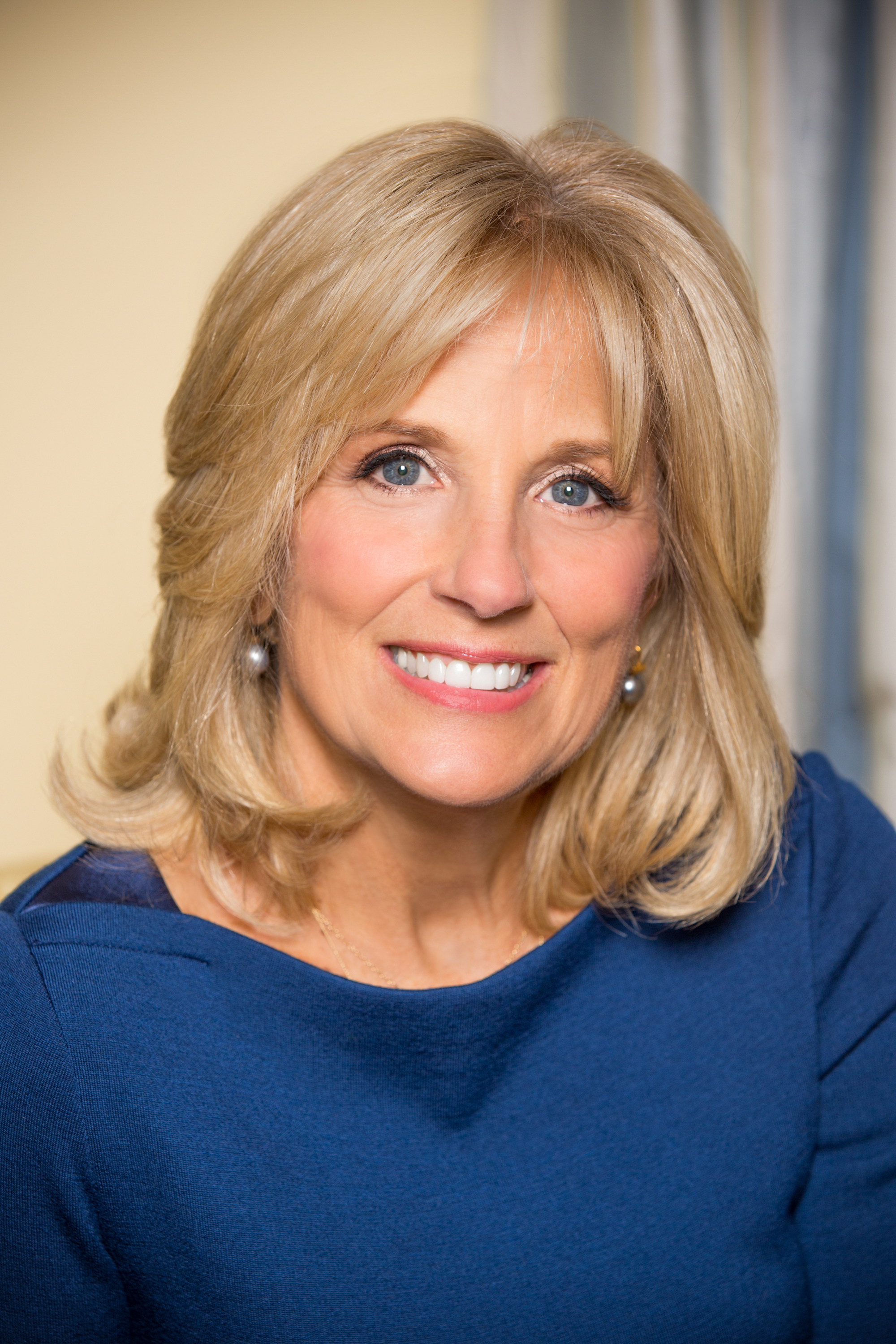
Jill Biden

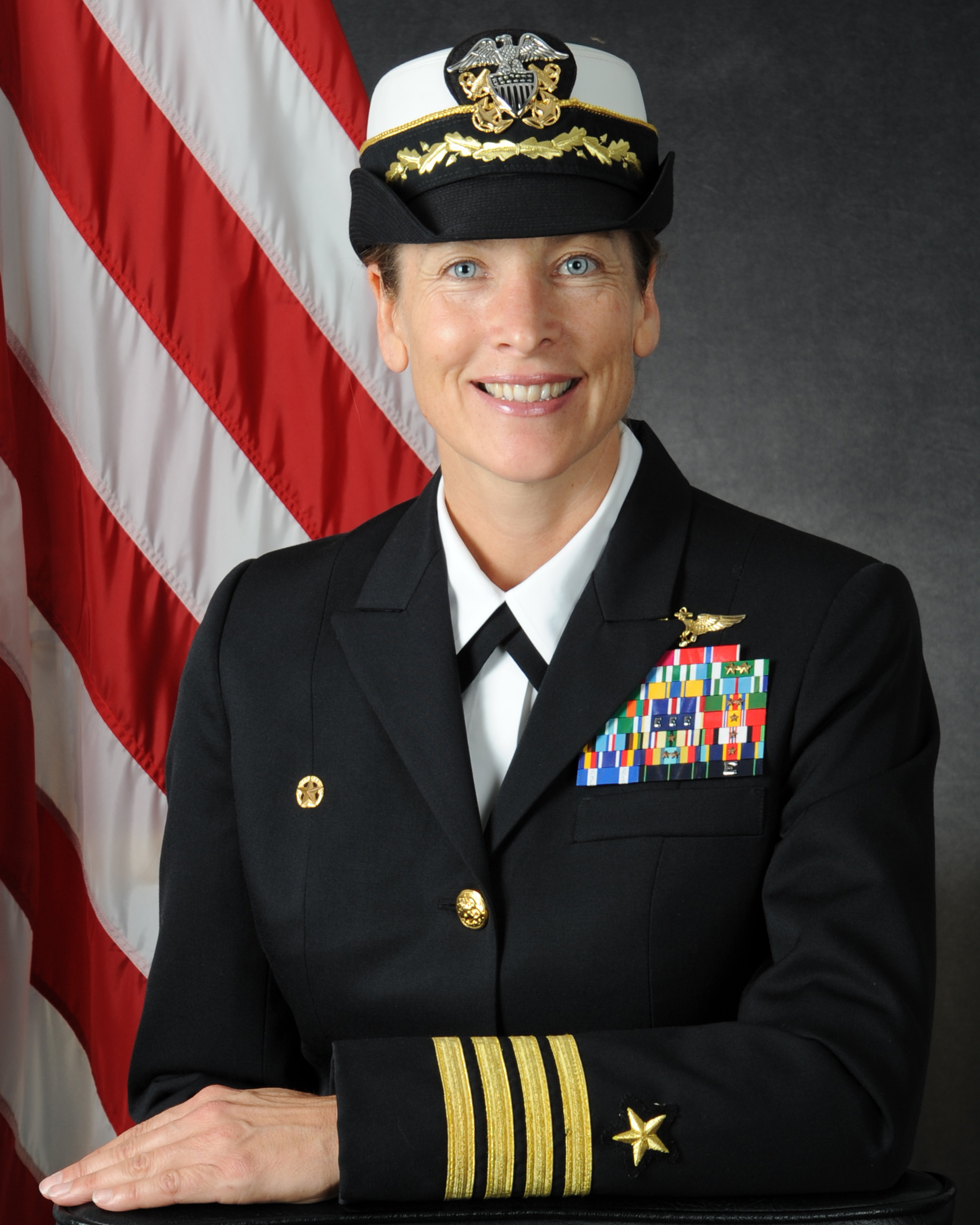
Shoshana S. Chatfield

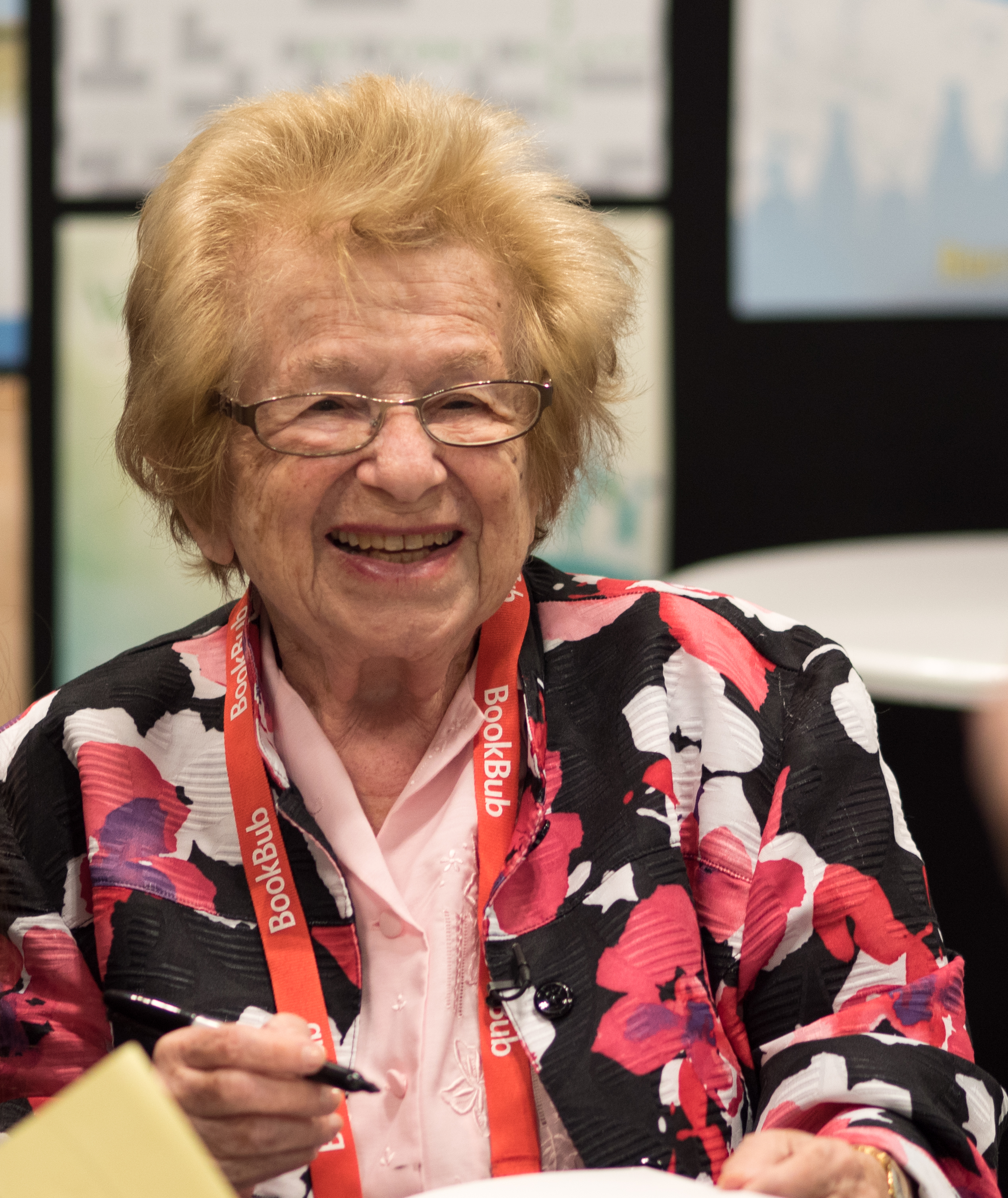
Ruth Westheimer

- Michael Apple – educational theorist, writer, and professor
- Katherine Albrecht – privacy expert and talk-radio host
- Eva Baker - distinguished professor, scholar, researcher
- Deborah Britzman - writer, researcher, psychoanalyst, and professor
- Deborah Bial – president and founder of The Posse Foundation, Inc
- Jill Biden – Former First Lady of the United States, Former Second Lady of the United States
- Jamaal Bowman – U.S. Congressman
- Miguel Cardona – U.S. Secretary of Education
- Shoshana Chatfield – first female President of the Naval War College
- Bill Cosby – stand-up comedian, actor, and author
- Linda Darling-Hammond – writer, researcher, education adviser to Barack Obama, and professor
- Lisa Delpit – educator, author, and professor
- John Duda – actor and educator
- Nell Duke – author and researcher
- Wayne Dyer – self-help author
- E. Gordon Gee – educator and president of multiple universities
- Carol D. Goodheart – American Psychological Association president in 2010
- Irwin Hyman – researcher and professor known for research on the negative effects of corporal punishment
- Timothy R. Lannon – university president
- Ronald Levant – American Psychological Association president in 2005, known for research regarding fatherhood
- Sonia Nieto – author and teacher in the field of multicultural education
- Shaquille O'Neal – professional basketball player, analyst, and businessman
- Thomas S. Popkewitz – curriculum theorist and professor
- Neil Postman – author, media theorist, and cultural critic
- Stephen Raudenbush – professor, scholar who developed hierarchical linear models (HLM)
- Betty Shabazz – educator, civil rights advocate, and wife of Malcolm X
- Chris Spence – author, former educator, and professional football player
- Ruth "Dr. Ruth" Westheimer – sex therapist, professor, talk show host, and author
- Mary Zanarini – psychologist and researcher

== See also ==
- Certified teacher
- Bachelor of Education (BEd)
- Master of Arts in Teaching (MAT)
- Master of Education (MEd, EdM)
- Educational Specialist (EdS, or Specialist in Education)
- Doctor of Engineering
- Doctor of Business Administration
