= Maxine Greene =

American philosopher (1917–2014)

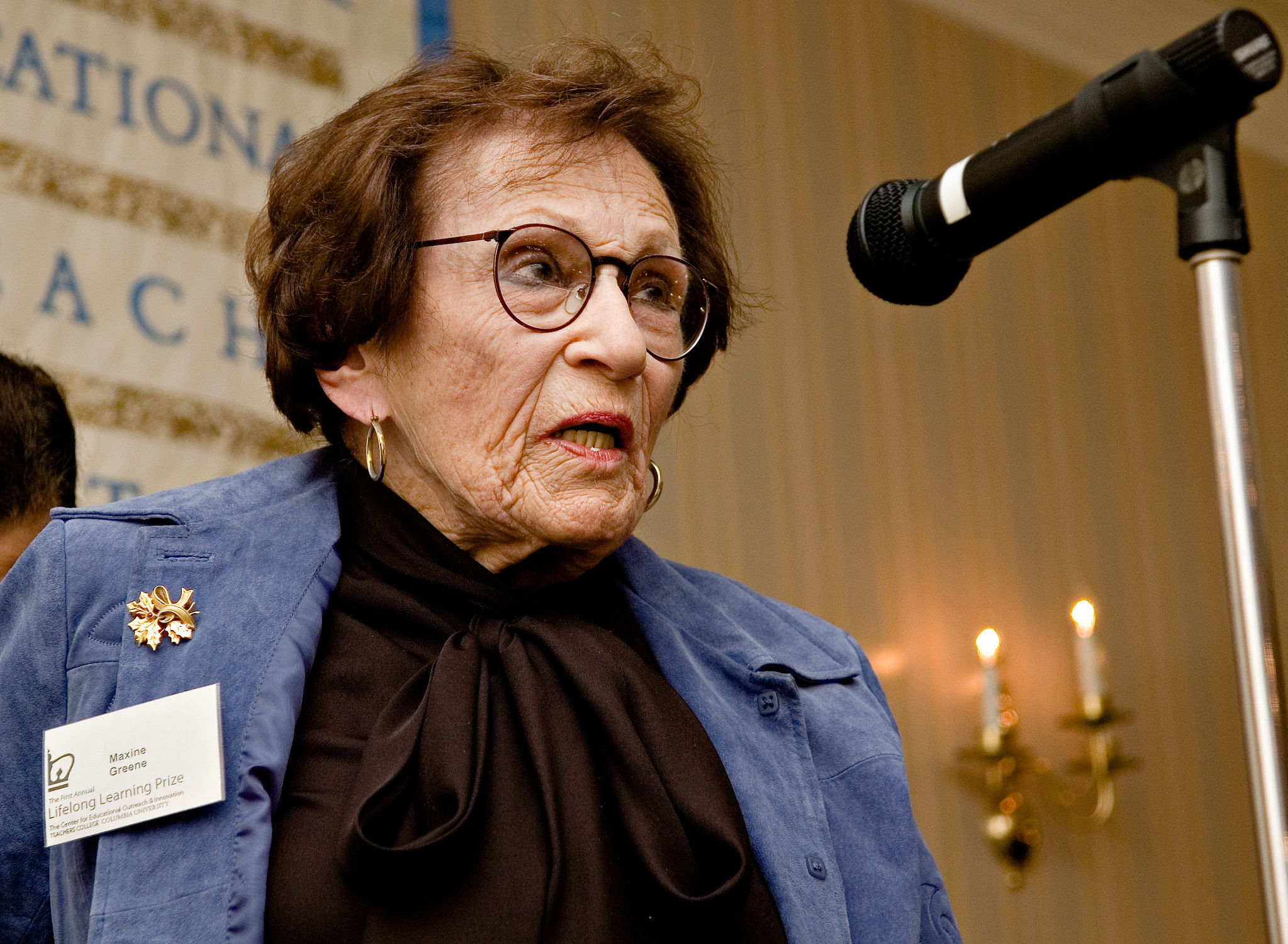
- Greene in 2005
- Born: December 23, 1917; Brooklyn, New York
- Died: May 29, 2014 (aged 96); Manhattan, New York

Education
- Education: BA in American History and Philosophy from Barnard College in 1938; Masters of Arts from New York University in 1949; PhD from New York University in Educational Philosophy

Philosophical work
- Era: Contemporary philosophy
- Region: Western Philosophy
- School: Continental Philosophy
- Main interests: Philosophy of Education; Political Philosophy; Social Justice

Sarah Maxine Greene (née Meyer; December 23, 1917 – May 29, 2014) was an American educational philosopher, author, social activist, and teacher. Described upon her death as "perhaps the most iconic and influential living figure associated with Teachers College, Columbia University", she was a pioneer for women in the field of philosophy of education, often being the sole woman presenter at educational philosophy conferences as well as the second woman elected as president of the Philosophy of Education Society in 1967. Additionally, she was the third woman to preside over the American Educational Research Association in 1981.

== Early years and education ==
Born in Brooklyn on December 23, 1917, to Lily Greenfield and Max Meyer, Greene (née Meyer) was the oldest of four siblings. The family owned a successful business, which her father established, named Richelieu Pearls. Greene was largely raised in a way which conformed to the cultural expectations of women at that time. From an early age, however, she demonstrated an affinity towards the arts. Describing her family as one who "discouraged intellectual adventure and risk", she disregarded that approach and from the age of 7 regularly attended concerts and plays as a means of escape. Also at that age, Greene began to explore her desire to be a writer. Her pursuit of creative writing continued for many years as she authored novels and stories until attending graduate school when her writing transitioned to nonfiction. She wrote her first novel for her father, who she adored and whose attention was formative for Greene.

As a child, Greene and her siblings attended a local private Episcopalian school, Berkeley School (now Berkeley Carroll School). Having achieved high marks and academic awards, Greene graduated in 1934. At a time when only 10-15% of women attended college, Greene enrolled at Barnard College, Columbia University where she received a bachelor of arts with a major in American history and minor in philosophy in 1938. She was the first in her family to attain a higher education degree.

Greene had not received any encouragement to attend graduate school or to continue her education. Instead, as was a typical path for Barnard graduates of the time, Greene eloped and started a family. She married a doctor named Joseph Krimsley in March 1938, with whom she had a daughter, Linda. In the early years of the marriage, she managed his medical office while also pursuing her writing ambitions. She authored several historical and personal novels that despite negotiations with publishers did not go to press. Greene described Krimsley as unsympathetic to her intellectual aspirations and after his deployment and return from the war, they divorced. Greene married Orville Greene on August 7, 1947 and remained married to him until his death in 1997. It was only after this second marriage that Greene entertained the notion of returning to school. In the film Exclusions and Awakenings: The Life of Maxine Greene, Greene recounts that her career in education began largely due to demands of child rearing. When identifying and choosing a graduate program, she needed to find courses offered when her children were at school. For that reason, She enrolled in courses at New York University School of Education taught by Adolphe Meyer, Theodore Brameld and George Axtelle. She remained there and completed her Master of Arts (1949) and PhD (1955) both in the Philosophy of Education.

== Academic career ==
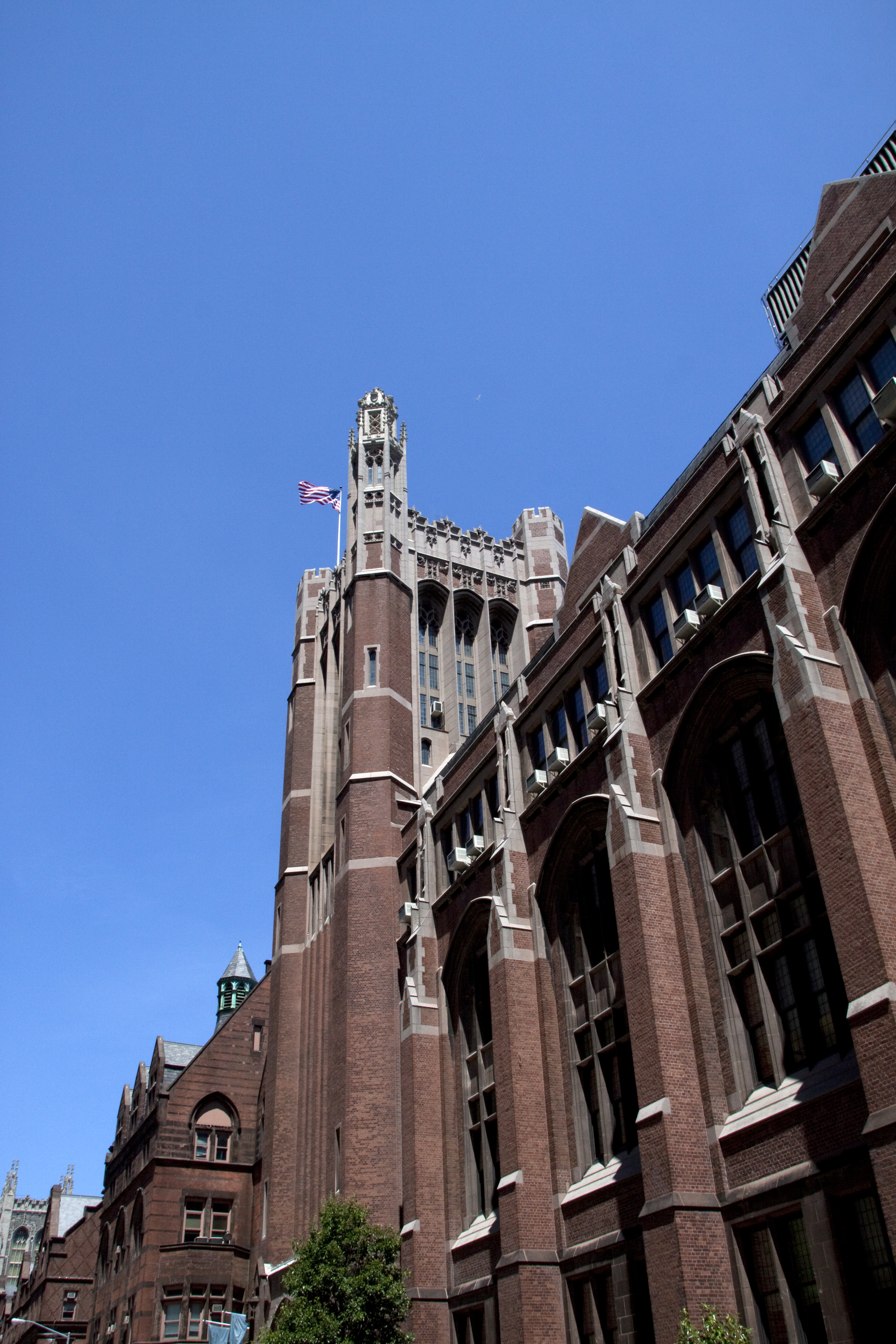
Teachers College, Columbia University

After completing her doctorate, Greene's ambition was to become a faculty member of a Department of the Philosophy of Education, which was challenging as a woman in 1950s and 1960s academia. Until she attained that goal, she occupied faculty positions, primarily in English departments, at various institutions in proximity to her New York city home. She taught at New York University between 1949 and 1956 and between 1957 and 1959, Montclair State College as assistant professor between 1956 and 1957, and Brooklyn College as Associate Professor of Education from 1962 to 1965. During the summer of 1960 and 1962, Greene was a visiting lecturer at the University of Hawaiʻi.

In 1965 Greene was invited to become faculty and the editor of the Teachers College Record, a peer reviewed journal published by Teachers College, Columbia University, which she accepted. Facing resistance from the male faculty in the Department of Philosophy and Social Sciences that previously had not included any females, she initially became a member of the English Department. Her work was perceived as unsuitable and outside of the dominant philosophy of education disciplinary discourse, as Greene reflected in 2009, "my writing was described as not the writing of a philosopher but of an artist." Rules prohibited women from entering the shared faculty club, which further isolated Greene from fellow philosophers. Nonetheless, in a few years time (1967), she secured a faculty position in the Department of Philosophy and Social Sciences where she remained until her retirement. Greene broke traditional convention with her narrative and literary form as well as through her philosophical approach, transitioning from analytic to existential schools of thought, that shaped the field moving forward. She served as the William F. Russell Professor in the Foundations of Education at the Teachers College of Columbia from 1975 to 1998 and was professor emeritus thereafter.

Despite being in the minority as a female, she was elected to several leadership roles within scholarly societies and associations. In 1981, Greene was elected as president of the American Educational Research Association (AERA). Greene recalls that appointment as one of the most startling events in her career, in part, because a woman had not filled that role in over 31 years. Greene also served as president of the Philosophy of Education Society (1967), American Educational Studies Association (1972), and the Middle Atlantic States Philosophy of Education Society. Additionally, she served on municipal and state curriculum committees as well as consultant to the United States Department of Education from 1965 to 1967.

== Selected works ==
Maxine Greene wrote and spoke extensively about aesthetic education, social imagination, wide-awakeness, and educational reform. For Greene, the inclusion of arts in education was a means to reveal the social conditions that shape schools and to spark imagination that looks beyond current conditions towards future change. She was an advocate for approaches to education founded on concepts of freedom and humanity. A prolific writer, her works signal an intellectual heritage with existential philosophers: Jean-Paul Sartre, Simone de Beauvoir, Albert Camus, Soren Kierkegaard, and Maurice Merleau-Ponty. She was also influenced by her contemporaries such as Paulo Freire, Hannah Arendt, and Fritjof Capra. She wrote more than 100 articles and essays, 40 contributed chapters, six books and one edited collection.

In 1967, Greene published Existential Encounters for Teachers which marked her move as one of the first educational philosophers to draw out connections between existential philosophy and educational theory. The text was written for practicing teachers and invited their contemplation of teacher identity and authentic relationships with learners by drawing upon the works of existential philosophers. Her second book Teacher as Stranger: Educational Philosophy for the Modern Age was published in 1973 and further explicates Greene's critical existential philosophy as applied to teachers. She challenges teachers to "do philosophy" and to deliberately consider choices and responsibility for a socially just education. Twenty years after its publication, Greene stated that her goal for the book was to instill in teachers the realization that "to help kids shape their identity, we've got to awaken them to their own questions and encourage them to create their own projects. They don't really learn unless they ask." In 1974, the book won the "Educational Book of the Year" award from Delta Kappa Gamma.

Throughout her writing, Greene references specific works of literature, film, and other art forms, as she did in her 1988 publication, The Dialectic of Freedom. She illustrates her arguments with biographical sketches and life stories as well as citing literature from: W.H. Auden, Edith Wharton, Virginia Woolf, Kate Chopin, Henry James, Langston Hughes. The text was originally given as her John Dewey Lecture presented at a meeting of the American Educational Research Association, in which she calls on North American educators to examine models from diverse educators across the globe who successfully center learning on imagination and possibility. Greene's primary claim is that the pursuit of a pedagogy for freedom is situated in specific time and contexts, and, therefore, is an ongoing process that requires educators, in community, to continually pose questions about what has become accepted or given in educational systems. For Greene, transformations are possible when educators and students, inspired by works of literature and art, enter into dialog in public spaces. The text has been cited as an essential theoretical work within liberatory and critical pedagogies, alongside Freire's Pedagogy of the Oppressed, Illich's Deschooling Society, and Rancière's The Ignorant Schoolmaster. While written in response to the social situation of the 1980s, the text continues in its relevance to educators.

Extremely well known for her inspiring and lyrical speaking, her lectures given between 1974 and 1977 were compiled, revised, and published in Landscapes of Learning (1978). The book is organized into four thematic sections: Emancipatory education, Social issues, Artistic and aesthetic considerations, and Predicaments of women. The book, whose title is borrowed from Wordsworth's poem "The Prelude", primarily concentrates on Greene's concept of wide-awakeness that challenges teachers and learners to be fully aware of both the internal and external landscapes that influence schools.

In Releasing the Imagination (1995), through narrative essays, Greene urges educators to be aware of inequities, complacency, and exclusions in everyday life and in schools. She argues that imagination and the arts can, and should, play a key role in helping educators to look on education anew, to shift inherited perspectives, and to pursue reimagined approaches for learning. The text reiterates Greene's belief that, through the cultivation of dialog in public spaces, change for education and for broader social impact are possible. The text organizes 14 essays into three sections: creating possibilities, illuminations and epiphanies, and community in the making.

In Variations on a Blue Guitar (2001), thirty of Greene's lectures given at the Lincoln Center from 1980 onward are collected into one volume. The title is based on Wallace Stevens' poem, Man with the Blue Guitar, in which arguably the poet converses with Picasso's painting the Old Guitarist. The poem's theme, seeking alternatives to the way things are, resonated with Greene's concept of social imagination. In the lectures, Greene defines aesthetic education and articulates how inquiry and cognition are built through encounters with works of art. For Greene, the purpose of the book was "to make aesthetics entirely accessible to public school teachers who may never have had a class in philosophy."

Her works have had broad influence on educators, philosophers, social theorists, artists, and community activists, many of whom continue to reference and build on her work.

== Selected concepts ==
=== Aesthetic education ===
Greene advocated for the use of arts, dance, music, literary, among other artistic texts as classroom content that could foster learner engagement and could help learners to view their worlds with renewed perspective. Greene insisted that education move away from the habitual and routine practices in order to create classrooms that engage with immediate and relevant social circumstances, an approach that builds on John Dewey's notions of aesthetic experiences. Arguing against a generic and abstracted approach to teaching, Greene emphasized a focus on the uniqueness of the teachers and learners occupying a specific learning space. In addition to her writings on the topic, Greene worked with school teachers on educational and aesthetic theory during her 30 years as philosopher in residence for the Lincoln Center for the Arts in Education.

=== Social imagination ===
The importance of imagination in Greene's writing is often captured through her references to the poet Emily Dickinson: "I believe that it is imagination that lights the slow fuse of possibility." According to Greene, social imagination enables a breaking with habitual ways of doing and perceiving to imagine futures that are more just and equitable. Integrating the arts in education allows teachers to invite learners to imagine things differently and to grasp their potential to transform realities, according to Greene's conception of social imagination. Janet Miller, Professor of English Education at Columbia University, wrote of Greene, "Maxine's attention to the visual, written and performing arts as one means of opening vistas into what might be, and to conceptions of social imagination that might help move persons to take action against deficit versions of school and society, continue to inspire all those involved in the varied arenas of education."

=== Wide-awakeness ===
Wide-awakeness is a concept that Greene drew from phenomenologist Alfred Schütz and poet Henry David Thoreau, which describes a degree of consciousness necessary for actors to critically and deliberately make choices and have impact on the world. Wide-awakeness assumes that an individual who actively perceives as they experience the world would be equipped to pose meaningful questions and potentially to enact change. Heritage of this concept is also drawn to Paulo Freire's conscientization and John Dewey's extraordinary experiences.

== Public works ==
Greene placed tremendous importance on the public sphere as a location to collectively engage in intellectual dialog beyond traditional education boundaries, and as such has been grouped with thinkers like Susan Sontag under the title: New York Intellectual. Even after her retirement, friends, scholars, and students recall salons hosted by Greene in her 5th Avenue apartment near the Solomon R. Guggenheim Museum and the Metropolitan Museum of Art. She hosted well-known thinkers of the time, such as the critical educator, Paulo Freire with whom shared foundational beliefs about education.

Notably her public engagement led to participation in a number of organizations and centers that advanced aesthetic education and social imagination. Greene influenced thousands of educators through her position as Philosopher-in-Residence of the Lincoln Center Institute for the Arts in Education, now known as the Lincoln Center Education. The center hosts annual summer institutes where practicing teachers attend a series of lectures and performances, as well as interacting with artists through hands on activities. The primary goal is to expose teachers to aesthetics in education and to demonstrate the impact arts may have on learning. Between 1976 and 2012, Greene lectured at the summer sessions in her capacity as philosopher-in-residence. Greene recalls this as one of her most significant career experiences because it afforded the opportunity to work with practicing teachers and to potentially broaden the number of schools bringing arts into learning.

In 2003, she founded the Maxine Greene Foundation for Social Imagination, the Arts, and Education, now known as The Maxine Greene Center for Aesthetic Education and Social Imagination. Greene credits collaborations with Bill Ayers, Michelle Fine, Naomi Barber, and Carole Saltz as essential to making the foundation possible. The foundation supports the creation and appreciation of works that embody fresh social visions. In Greene's words, the foundation hoped that through encounters with the arts they could awaken in people "their own questions, their own sense of predicament, their longings for something better" with the goal of generating "inquiry, imagination and the creation of art works by diverse people." Grants of up to $10,000 are awarded to educators and artists to fund programming such as Barnard College's Storytelling Project, the Stella Adler Studio of Acting, the Boston Arts Academy Foundation, the Bronx Charter School for the Arts, and the Center for Peace Building International.

In a similar project, she inspired the creation of the High School of Arts, Imagination and Inquiry in association with Lincoln Center Education and New Visions for Public Schools in 2005. The school, located in Manhattan, New York, encourages students to expand their imaginative capacities in the arts and other subject areas. The school pursues the experiential learning and aesthetics in education that Greene espoused. For example, artists regularly visit to collaborate with teachers on the design of curriculum to integrated traditional academics alongside the arts.

== Selected honors ==
Greene was the recipient of honorary degrees in the Humanities from Lehigh University, Hofstra University, the University of Colorado at Denver, Indiana University, Goddard College, Bank Street College, Nazareth College (Rochester, New York), McGill University, College Misericordia, and Binghamton University. She was awarded the Medal of Honor from Teachers College and Barnard College; Educator of the Year Award from Phi Delta Kappa, Columbia University, and Ohio University; the Scholarly Achievement Award from Barnard College; AERA's Lifetime Achievement Award; and received a Fulbright Program fellowship, which took her to New Zealand. She was elected to the National Academy of Education in 1984.

In 2004, the Columbia Teachers College Trustees created the Maxine Greene Chair for Distinguished Contributions to Education which recognize Greene's contributions to philosophy and education, social theory, arts and aesthetics by honoring outstanding faculty. Nancy Lesko, Professor of Education, was the first to receive the distinction.

== Death and legacy ==
In her final years and beyond, admirers of the scholar continued to celebrate her life. Markie Hancock produced a documentary film of Greene's life, Exclusions and Awakenings, that premiered at the New School in February 2001 with Greene and more than 700 attendees in the audience. On Greene's 90th birthday, the Teachers College hosted a celebration titled "Toward Pedagogy of Thought and Imagination" that included lectures from Greene among others. Similarly, a 2017 issue of the journal Review of Education, Pedagogy, and Cultural Studies celebrated the centennial year of Greene's birth. The issue includes articles by education scholars who reflect on Greene's intellectual heritage and impact. The authors include: Henry Giroux, John Baldacchino, Susan Jean Mayer, Hannah Spector, Robert Lake, Tricia Kress, Rebecca Luce-Kapler, Sabrina Ross, and Christopher Emdin.

Upon her death in 2014, Greene was 96 years old. Greene was survived by her son, daughter-in-law, step daughter, and grandson.

Robert Lake edited a collection of 75 letters written in the first-person by admirers and scholars influenced by Maxine Greene, including: Gloria Ladson-Billings, Herb Kohl, Mike Rose, Deborah Meier, Nel Noddings, and William Ayers. The collection, Dear Maxine: Letters from the Unfinished Conversation (2010), includes excerpts from conversations between Janet Miller and Greene as well as a foreword by the scholar of multiculturalism, Sonia Nieto. The letters are organized into four sections: The school and society; In a tune beyond us and yet ourselves; Strangers, others, and friends: Expanding the conversation; and Blue guitar lessons: The Arts and keeping wide-awake in the world.

A Light in Dark Times: Maxine Greene and the Unfinished Conversation, edited by William Ayers and Janet Miller, collects considerations of Greene's influence on contemporary educational projects written by William Ayers, Nel Noddings, Peter McLaren, Jean Anyon, Louise Berman, Deborah P. Britzman, Linda Darling-Hammond among others. While, William Pinar's edited volume, titled The Passionate Mind of Maxine Greene: "I Am—Not Yet," includes twenty two chapters that begin with Greene's "Autobiographical Remembrance" and moves onto thematic sections: Four books, Themes, Influences on Greene's thought, and Greene's influence on educational theory. The title draws from an oft-cited phrase which Greene uttered on June 27, 1996 during a lecture at Louisiana State University: "I am who I am not yet."

== Bibliography ==
=== Books ===
- The Public School and the Private Vision: the Search for America in Education and Literature (Random House, 1965)
- Existential Encounters for Teachers (Random House, 1967)
- Teacher as Stranger: Educational Philosophy for the Modern Age (Wadsworth Publishing, 1973)
- Landscapes of Learning (Teachers College Press, 1978)
- The Dialectic of Freedom (Teachers College Press, 1988)
- Variations on a Blue Guitar: The Lincoln Center Institute Lectures on Aesthetic Education (Teachers College Press, 2001)
- Releasing the Imagination: Essays on Education, the Arts, and Social Change (National Association of Independent Schools, 2004)

=== Selected contributions to edited volumes ===
- "Introduction: Teaching for Social Justice", In: William Ayers, Jean Ann Hunt, and Therese Quinn. Teaching for Social Justice: A Democracy and Education Reader. New Press (1998)
- "Forward", In: John Dewey, How We Think. Houghton Mifflin (1998).
- "Forward", In: Linda Lambert, Deborah Walker, Diane P. Zimmerman, and Joanne E. Cooper. The Constructivist Leader. Teachers College Press (2002).
- "Feminism, Philosophy, and Education: Imagining Public Spaces", In: Nigel Blake et al. The Blackwell Guide to the Philosophy of Education. Blackwell (2003), pages 73–92.
- "Foreword", In: Colin Lankshear and Peter L. McLaren. Critical Literacy: Politics, Praxis, and the Postmodern. State University of New York (1993), pages ix–xi.
- "An Autobiographical Remembrance", In: William F. Pinar. The Passionate Mind of Maxine Greene 'I am ... not yet'. Falmer Press (1998), pages 8–11.

=== Selected articles ===
- "Imaginary Gardens with Real Toads in Them': The Literary Experience and Educational Philosophy." Philosophy of Education, volume 19 (1963), pages 170–192.
- "Toward Wide-Awakeness: An Argument for the Arts and Humanities in Education." Teachers College Record, volume 79, number 1 (1977), pages 119–125.
- "In Search of a Critical Pedagogy." Harvard Educational Review (1986), pages 427–441.
- "The Spaces of Aesthetic Education." Journal of Aesthetic Education, volume 20 (1986), pages 56–62.

=== Thesis ===
- Naturalist-humanism in eighteenth century England: An Essay in the Sociology of Knowledge (Thesis, 1956)

== Talks, lectures and other work ==
- Arts and the Search for Social Justice (Lecture at The Maxine Greene Foundation for Social Imagination, The Arts & Education, 2003)
- Active Learning and Aesthetic Encounters (Talks at the Lincoln Center Institute, National Center for Reconstructing Education, Schools and Teaching, 1994)
- Education, Freedom and Possibility (Russell Lecture, 1975)
- Educational Research and National Policy Keynote Address: Jubilee Week, August 3, 1982. The Ohio State University College of Education.
- Lending the Work your Life: A Celebration with Maxine Greene (Lincoln Center Institute, 2006)
- A Teacher Talks to Teachers: Perspectives on the Lincoln Center Institute (Lincoln Center Institute, 1980)

== See also ==
- American philosophy
- Art Education
- Creativity
- John Dewey
- Imagination
- Lincoln Center Institute
- Lincoln Center for the Performing Arts
- List of American philosophers
- Philosophy of education
- Small schools movement
