= Pay-to-publish =

Pay-to-publish can refer to:

- Open-access journal publishing
- Vanity presses
- Self-publishing
