= Kameisha Jerae Hodge =

American writer

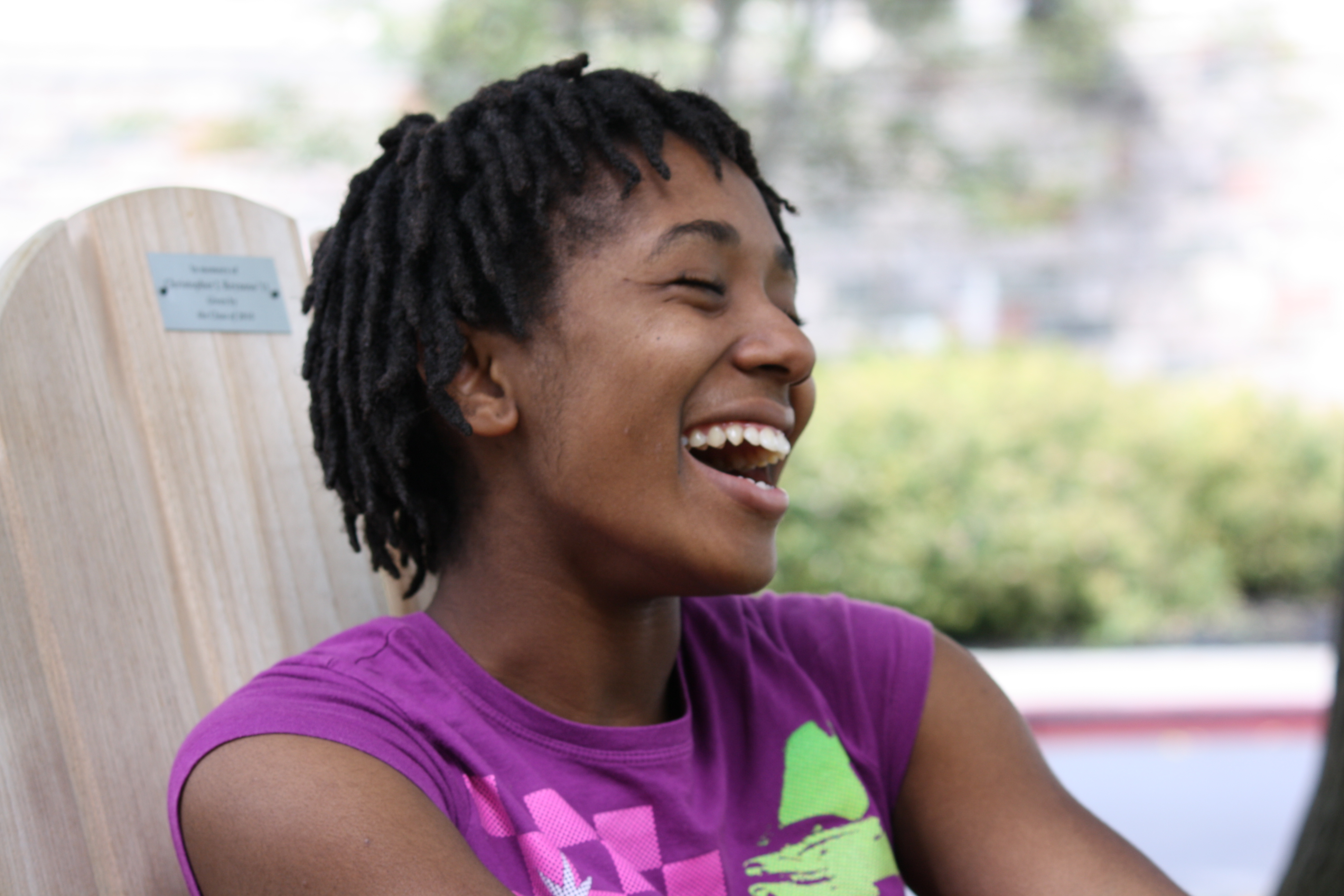
- Hodge in 2010
- Born: November 1, 1989 (age 36); Washington, D.C., USA
- Education: Lafayette College (BA); Southern New Hampshire University (MA)
- Occupations: Writer, editor, poet, spoken word artist

Kameisha Jerae Hodge (pronounced /kəmiːʃə dʒɛreɪ hɒdʒ/; born November 1, 1989) is an American writer, publisher, poet, and spoken word artist from Washington, D.C. She is the founder and CEO of Sovereign Noir Publications, a publishing company established in 2019 that elevates Black women's voices.

== Early life ==
Hodge was born in 1989 in Washington, D.C., the oldest of eleven, and she, a brother, and a sister were raised by their mother Sabrina. For a while, they were homeless, staying with relatives or at homeless shelters.

Hodge began reading in poetry competitions while in elementary school. In tenth grade, she met her mentor, Yolonda D. Coleman, who introduced her to journalism, publishing, and writing and taught her how to "exist in the industry as a Black girl". Coleman-Body encouraged Hodge to write for Rated-T, the school magazine; Hodge became a reporter, writer, and editor. She also served as the Editor-in-Chief of Knight Vision, the school newspaper. She graduated from Friendship Collegiate Academy Public Charter School in 2007.

Hodge attended Lafayette College as a Posse Scholar and English and Africana major and quickly became involved with campus life.

She served as the VP of Writing Organization Reaching Dynamic Students, a student arts group; performed at mic nights and poetry slams; started Lafayette's step team; was resident of the Association of Black Collegians; co-hosted a radio show with DJ Spyda Da Don; and oversaw the African-Caribbean interest floor in her dorm. She also interned at MTV's development department for The N during her summer break. While there, she was a live audience member for Total Request Live and in the pilot episode of Dance or Drop, a proposed MTV show. She graduated from Lafayette in 2012 with a BA in English and moved on to pursue an MA in English and creative writing with a concentration in poetry from Southern New Hampshire University.

She also has a certificate in publishing.

== Career ==
Hodge self-published her first poetry collection, Atlas of Consciousness, in 2010 while still a student at Lafayette. Since then, two more collections have been published: Double Consciousness: An Autoethnic Guide to My Black American Experience (July 2014) and Woman. Queer. Black. (November 2021). She has been a #1 bestselling author on Amazon, is published in the Georgetown Journal of Law & Modern Critical Race Perspectives, and was a TEDx speaker at Lafayette College. She has also worked with Martha's Table, NPR, WAMU, UrRepublic, and Viacom.

Hodge founded Sovereign Noir Publications, a publisher focused on elevating Black women writers, in 2019. She and high school classmate Charles Smith founded i2Kings1Queen Publishing. She is also a mentor for the First Ladies of Poverty Foundation.

== Personal life ==
Hodge is a lesbian.

== Awards and honors ==
Year	Award name	Award Body	Reference
2007	Editor's Choice Award	Poetry.com	
2008	Editor's Choice Award	Poetry.com	
2008	Silver Communicator Award	International Academy of the Visual Arts	
2008	Poems and Poets of the Year Award	Poetry.com	
2009	Aaron O. Hoff Program of the Year Award	Lafayette College	
2011	Certificate of Academic Acknowledgement	The McDonogh Network (Lafayette College)	
2012	Honorary Founder Award	Precision Step Team (Lafayette College)	
2012	Global Cultural Competition	Café de la Penseé	
2014	Hey Grow! Hero Award	Directions for Our Youth	
2014	Poetry Book of the Year	Rainbow Rendezvous	
2016	Best Nonfiction Author	Rainbow Rendezvous	
2016	Poet of the Year	Rainbow Rendezvous	
2016	Best Poetry Book of 2016	Rainbow Rendezvous	
2017	Social Marketer Certification	Hootsuite	
