= Michele Moses =

American education scholar and academic administrator

Michele S. Moses
- Known for: Research on affirmative action, higher education access, and academic freedom and free speech on campus
- Awards: Hazel Barnes Prize (2016); Provost’s Faculty Achievement Award (2011); AERA Early Career Award (2009)

Academic background
- Education: University of Virginia (B.A)

Academic work
- Discipline: Philosophy of education; Education policy
- Institutions: University of Colorado Boulder

Michele S. Moses is an American philosopher of education and academic administrator. She is Professor of Educational Foundations, Policy and Practice and Vice Chancellor and Senior Vice Provost for Faculty Affairs at the University of Colorado Boulder. Her research focuses on ethics, education policy, higher education, moral disagreement, and race-conscious policies in education, using democratic theories to examine critical issues, such as academic freedom and affirmative action. She is a fellow of the American Educational Research Association and has served on its Executive Board, as President of the Philosophy of Education Society and as co-editor of AERA Open.

== Early life and education ==
Moses was born in New York City to immigrant parents. She earned a Bachelor of Arts in Latin American studies from the University of Virginia, a Master of Education in Higher Education and Student Affairs from the University of Vermont, and a Master of Arts in Philosophy and a Ph.D. in Educational Foundations, Policy and Practice from the University of Colorado Boulder, where she was recognized as Outstanding Doctoral Graduate.

== Career ==
Moses began her academic career as an assistant professor at Arizona State University from 2000 to 2005. She joined the University of Colorado Boulder as an associate professor with tenure in 2005 and was promoted to full professor in 2011.

Since 2019, Moses has served as Vice Provost for Faculty Affairs at CU Boulder. She was promoted to Vice Chancellor and Senior Vice Provost in January 2025.

Moses is a fellow of the National Education Policy Center and the Center for Values and Social Policy.

Moses has served on the Committee on Faculty Affairs of the Association of Public and Land-grant Universities. She has held editorial roles for several leading journals, including associate editor of the American Educational Research Journal and co-editor of AERA Open. She has served as president of the Philosophy of Education Society, delivering the Presidential Address in 2023.

== Research and publications ==
Moses's research focuses on democratic theory, moral disagreement, and higher education policy. She has written widely on issues of educational equity, campus speech, and ethics in education, and her work is often grounded in philosophical inquiry.

She is the author of three books:

- Embracing Race: Why We Need Race-Conscious Education Policy (2002)
- Affirmative Action Matters: Creating Opportunities for Students Around the World (2014), co-authored with Laura E. Jenkins
- Living with Moral Disagreement: The Enduring Controversy about Affirmative Action (2016)

She has published over 70 peer-reviewed journal articles and book chapters, with work appearing in journals such as American Educational Research Journal, Educational Researcher, Educational Theory, and the Journal of Philosophy of Education.

== Honors and recognition ==
Moses is a fellow of the American Educational Research Association (AERA), which also awarded her its Early Career Award in 2009. She received the National Academy of Education/Spencer Postdoctoral Fellowship, Spencer Dissertation Fellowship, and has twice been selected as a Fulbright Scholar: as a New Century Scholar and as a Fulbright Specialist.

In 2016, she received the Hazel Barnes Prize, CU Boulder's highest faculty award, recognizing the integration of teaching and research. She has also been recognized with awards for graduate advising, inclusive excellence, research, and teaching.

== Selected publications ==
- Moses, M. S. & Wilson, T. S. (2025). "Philosophy and Education Policy." In L. Cohen-Vogel, J. Scott, & P. Youngs (Eds.), American Educational Research Association Handbook on Education Policy Research (2nd ed.). American Educational Research Association.
- Moses, M. S. (2023). "Democracy, Extremism, and the Crisis of Truth in Education." Philosophy of Education, 79(1), 1–28.
- Moses, M. S. (2021). "‘Very Fine People on Both Sides:’ Diverse Viewpoints, Truth, and Free Speech on Campus." Educational Studies, 1–13. doi:10.1080/00131946.2021.1894440
- Moses, M. S. & Wilson, T. S. (2020). "When Is It Democratically Legitimate to Opt Out of Public Education." Educational Theory, 70(3), 255–276. doi:10.1111/edth.12425
- Moses, M. S. & Wiley, K. E. (2020). "Social Context Matters: Bridging Philosophy and Sociology to Strengthen Conceptual Foundations for College Access Research." American Educational Research Journal. First published online October 30, 2019. doi:10.3102/0002831219885309
- Moses, M. S., Maeda, D. J., & Paguyo, C. H. (2019). "Racial Politics, Resentment, and Affirmative Action: Asian Americans as ‘Model’ College Applicants." The Journal of Higher Education, 90(1), 1–16. doi:10.1080/00221546.2018.1441113
- Moses, M. S. (2010). "Moral and Instrumental Rationales for Affirmative Action in Five National Contexts." Educational Researcher, 39(3), 211–228. doi:10.3102/0013189X10365086
- Moses, M. S. & Saenz, L. P. (2008). "Hijacking Education Policy Decisions: The Case of Affirmative Action." Harvard Educational Review, 78(2), 289–310. doi:10.17763/haer.78.2.031547102j610762
- Moses, M. S. (2002). "The Heart of the Matter: Philosophy and Educational Research." Review of Research in Education, 26, 1–21. doi:10.3102/0091732X026001001
- Moses, M. S. (2001). "Affirmative Action and the Creation of More Favorable Contexts of Choice." American Educational Research Journal, 38(1), 3–36. doi:10.3102/00028312038001003
