= Urban Ecosystems =

- Discipline: Multidisciplinary; Ecology; Urban studies
- Language: English
- Edited by: Michael McKinney; Chi Yung Jim

Publication details
- History: 1997–present
- Publisher: Springer (International)
- Frequency: Bimonthly
- Open access: Hybrid

Standard abbreviations
- ISO 4: Urban Ecosyst.

Indexing
- ISSN: 1083-8155 (print); 1573-1642 (web)
- LCCN: 97643340
- OCLC no.: 32891255

Links
- Homepage on Springer

Urban Ecosystems is an peer-reviewed bimonthly transformative international scientific journal published by Springer.

The journal is interdisciplinary, with its articles covering relationships "between socioeconomic and ecological structures and processes in urban environments." Associated with the Society for Urban Ecology, the journal was established in 1997. Additionally, the journal undergoes a hybrid publishing method.

== See also ==
- Landscape and Urban Planning
