= Famous Poets Society =

The Famous Poets Society (also known as the Christian Poets Guild) was a vanity press that organized a poetry contest and offered self-publishing services.

Despite the company's claims to have awarded over $425,000 in cash prizes to selected poets over 8 years, nearly all writers who submitted works were accepted regardless of artistic merit, and they were required to buy the anthology (described in one NBC4 story as resembling a "yearbook" and being printed on "Xerox paper") in which they appeared in order to receive a copy of it; in addition, they had to pay significant fees to attend the contests' award ceremonies. The Winning Writers website lists the Famous Poets Society as service that aspiring poets should avoid, while an article in the Boston Phoenix described it as an outright scam, stating that its presumptive founder "[had] been preying on the naïveté and vanity of poets for 20 years."

== See also ==
- Poetry.com
