= Zanarini Rating Scale for Borderline Personality Disorder =

Diagnostic rating scale

The Zanarini Rating Scale for Borderline Personality Disorder (ZAN-BPD) is a standardized, diagnostic rating scale designed to measure the severity and changes in the symptoms of borderline personality disorder (BPD) over time. The assessment was developed by Mary Zanarini and her colleagues at McLean Hospital and released in 2003.

The original ZAN-BPD assessment utilizes a clinician-administered semi-structured interview format to assess each of the nine DSM-IV criteria for BPD, with the evaluation period spanning the previous week. In 2015, Zanarini and her colleagues released a self-reported version called the ZAN-BPD-SRV. In both versions of the assessment, each criterion is rated on a five-point Likert scale, from 0 (no symptoms) to 4 (severe symptoms). The sum of scores from each criterion yields the ZAN-BPD total score, which measures BPD symptom severity. This total score can range from 0, indicating no symptoms, to 36, indicating severe symptoms in all categories.

== See also ==
- Diagnostic classification and rating scales used in psychiatry
- McLean Screening Instrument for Borderline Personality Disorder (MSI-BPD)
