= Scott Tilson =

American businessman (born 1963)

Scott L. Tilson
- Born: May 11, 1963 (age 62); Baltimore, Maryland, United States
- Occupation: Businessman
- Known for: Poetry.com, Stamp Collection, Entrepreneurship

Scott Tilson (born May 11, 1963) is an American businessman who owned poetry.com and is the founder of "The International Collectors Society". He is also the co-owner of "Psychedelic Art Exchange".

== Career ==
Tilson started his business career at the age of 15, buying and selling rare United States coins under the name "Scott Tilson Rare Coins" while at the same time pursuing his graduation at Northwestern University in Evanston, Illinois.

In 1992, Tilson, along with his new business partner Jeffrey Franz, launched "The International Collectors Society" (ICS). The ICS operated by mass-market advertising, pushing its products via supermarket tabloids and magazines rather than the specialist hobby media used by most stamp dealerships. Initially, the company was formed with the idea of distributing Elvis Presley memorabilia, but when this endeavour failed to take off Franz and Tilson returned to postage stamps. ICS was sued by The Beatles in 1996 for distributing copyright-infringing stamps from Chad, Madagascar, Tanzania and Abkhazia.

== Purchase of Poetry.com ==
In June 1997, Tilson, along with Franz, purchased Poetry.com from Cendant Corporation. The company grew to over 2,000,000 paying members and they held conventions 3 times per year, each of which was attended by over 2500 poets. The company was sold in 2005 in a $9 million transaction to New Catalyst Fund. New Catalyst Fund sold the business to Lulu.com on March 7, 2009. On April 14, 2011, LuLu.com announced that they would close Poetry.com on May 4, 2011. On May 11, 2011, Tilson re-purchased Poetry.com from Lulu.com for ten dollars. Poetry.com shut down again in April 2018.

== Education ==
Tilson received his schooling from The Park School in Brooklandville, Maryland in 1981 and graduated from Northwestern University in 1985 with a B.A. in economics.

== Personal life ==
Tilson moved with his family to Park City, Utah in June 2005. He has been married to his wife Suzanne since 1990. They have three children, Kyle (born 1994) and Brooke and Grant (born 1997).
