= The Rabbit Who Wants to Fall Asleep =

The Rabbit Who Wants to Fall Asleep: A New Way Of Getting Children To Sleep (Swedish: Kaninen som så gärna ville somna: en annorlunda godnattsaga) is a 2011 children's book written by Swedish author, psychologist and academic Carl-Johan Forssén Ehrlin and illustrated by Irina Maununen. As its subtitle notes, the book is intended as a form of sleep induction. It uses standard hypnosis techniques to get children to relax; it differs from most children's books in that among the text to be read there are also instructions on how to read the text out loud, including the placement of deliberate yawns.

The book was originally written in Swedish, and was self-published, available via Amazon.com's print-on-demand service CreateSpace. It was later translated into six other languages, including English in 2014. After being released in English, it climbed up Amazon's bestseller charts, and in August 2015 it became the first self-published book to top the Amazon US chart. In September 2015, the book was acquired by Penguin Random House as part of a three-book deal. It is no longer available via print-on-demand.

The book's plot consists of the title character, Roger the Rabbit ("Kalle Kanin" in the original Swedish), travelling with his mother to visit his Uncle Yawn; along the way they meet creatures including Sleepy Snail and the Heavy-Eyed Owl.

The Rabbit Who Wants to Fall Asleep was parodied in 2016 by the book The Rabbit Who Wants to Go to Harvard by Diana Holquist and Christopher Eliopoulos, also published by Penguin Random House. The parody book also mocked American so-called helicopter parents.

A sequel to the book, The Little Elephant Who Wants to Fall Asleep, written by Ehrlin and illustrated by Sydney Hanson, was published in 2016. It is similar in structure to the original book but features a female protagonist, Ellen the Elephant.

== See also ==
- Bedtime story
