= Dorrance Publishing Company =

Subsidy publisher of printed and ebooks

- Status: Active
- Founded: 1920
- Founder: John Gordon Dorrance (1890–1957)
- Country of origin: United States
- Headquarters location: Pittsburgh, Pennsylvania
- Publication types: Books, ebooks, audiobooks
- Fiction genres: Fiction, non-fiction, poetry, how-to, business, children’s literature, coffee table books
- Imprints: I-Proclaim Books; Red Lead Press; RoseDog Books; Whitmore Publishing Company
- No. of employees: 73
- Official website: www.dorrancepublishing.com

Dorrance Publishing Company, Inc. is a Pittsburgh, Pennsylvania, United States–based book publishing company. The company publishes both traditional printed books as well as ebooks.

== History ==
Dorrance Publishing was founded by Gordon Dorrance in 1920. The Catalogue of Copyright Entries for that year lists "Dorrance & company, inc." publishing works The Pocket Chesterfield and Broken Shackles. Dorrance set up the company after a work he was editing did not complete publication with Scribners.

The company was established in Philadelphia and periodically changed address within Philadelphia and environs. By 1989 it was located in Monroeville, outside Pittsburgh. By 1991, the company's address was in Pittsburgh.

They have been accredited by the Better Business Bureau (BBB) since 1995. The BBB lists them as having started in June 1989, and also operating under the alternate publishing imprint names I-Proclaim Books, Red Lead Press, RoseDog Books, and Whitmore Publishing Company.

== In popular culture ==
Gordon Dorrance, the founder of Dorrance Publishing, was portrayed by actor Pierre Watkin in an episode of I Love Lucy entitled "Lucy Writes A Novel."

== Publications ==
A total of thirteen Dorrance Publishing titles have become bestsellers on Amazon Kindle.

In 1930, Dorrance published Prohibition Punches: A Book of Beverages by Roxana B. Doran, member of the Women's Christian Temperance Union.

In 1947, Dorrance published Away From the Here and Now by Clare Winger Harris, who is credited with being the first woman science fiction writer to use her given name in their publications.

== Better Business Bureau rating ==
As of May 2022, Dorrance Publishing had an A− rating with the Better Business Bureau with 70 complaints filed against them.
