= Irwin Hyman =

American psychologist

- Born: Irwin Abraham Meltzer Hyman; March 22, 1935; Neptune, New Jersey
- Died: February 7, 2005 (aged 69); Philadelphia, Pennsylvania
- Education: University of Maine; Rutgers University
- Known for: Research on corporal punishment of children
- Awards: Legends in School Psychology Award from the National Association of School Psychologists (2002)
- Scientific career
- Fields: School psychology
- Institutions: Temple University
- Thesis: Some effects of teaching Style on pupil behavior (1964)

Irwin Abraham Meltzer Hyman (March 22, 1935 – February 7, 2005) was an American school psychologist known for his research on, and opposition to, corporal punishment of children.

== Early life and education ==
Hyman was born on March 22, 1935, in Neptune, New Jersey. He received his B.A. from the University of Maine in 1958, followed by a M.Ed. in 1961 and Ed.D. in 1964, both from Rutgers University.

== Career ==
Hyman worked at the Vineland Training School (then known as the American Institute for Mental Studies) as chief of clinical services from 1966 to 1967. He then briefly taught at Newark State College before joining the faculty of Temple University in 1968. He was initially an associate professor of school psychology at Temple, and in 1975, he was named a full professor there, a position he held until his death. At Temple, he founded the National Center for the Study of Corporal Punishment and Alternatives in the Schools, after his research found evidence of negative effects of corporal punishment on children. He also served as director of the Center.

== Honors and awards ==
In 1999, Hyman received the Award for Distinguished Contributions to the Science and Profession of Psychology from the Pennsylvania Psychological Association. In 2002, he received the Legends in School Psychology Award from the National Association of School Psychologists.

== Personal life and death ==
Hyman died in Philadelphia, Pennsylvania, on February 7, 2005.
