= McLean Screening Instrument for Borderline Personality Disorder =

Medical screening questionnaire

The McLean Screening Instrument for Borderline Personality Disorder (MSI-BPD) is a 10-question self-report screening tool used to identify individuals who may warrant further evaluation for borderline personality disorder (BPD). The questionnaire asks individuals about the presence of symptoms they experience that are characteristic of BPD. The assessment was released in 2003 after being developed by Mary Zanarini and her colleagues at the McLean Hospital. It has since been translated into several languages, including Arabic, Finnish, French, Persian, and Urdu.

== Scoring ==
The MSI-BPD covers a broad spectrum of BPD characteristics, such as impulsivity, emotional instability, and difficulties with self-identity. Each question is answered with a "yes" or "no", indicating the presence or absence of a specific BPD symptom. A "yes" response to any item signifies the presence of that particular symptom. The total score, ranging from 0 to 10, is obtained by summing the values assigned to each answer (1 for yes, 0 for no).

== Validity ==
Research suggests that the MSI-BPD demonstrates good accuracy in identifying potential BPD cases. Zanarini's initial validation study in 2003 found the instrument to be both sensitive (81%) and specific (85%) in correctly classifying individuals when using a cutoff score of 7. For those 25 years old or younger, the study reported a sensitivity of 90% and a specificity of 93%. This study also found that the MSI-BPD exhibits strong internal consistency. A later study by Chanen et al. in 2008 reported lower sensitivity (68%) and specificity (75%) for those 15 to 24 years old using the same cutoff score.

== See also ==
- List of diagnostic classification and rating scales used in psychiatry
- Zanarini Rating Scale for Borderline Personality Disorder (ZAN-BPD)
