= Mary Zanarini =

Borderline Personality Disorder Scientist

Mary C. Zanarini
- Born: July 25, 1946 (age 80)
- Occupations: Psychologist, academic

Academic background
- Education: Harvard University (AB, EdM, EdD)

Academic work
- Institutions: Harvard University & McLean Hospital

Mary C. Zanarini (born July 25, 1946) is an American psychologist and academic. She is a professor of psychology at the Department of Psychiatry of Harvard Medical School and the creator of the McLean Study of Adult Development (MSAD) at the McLean Hospital. Much of Zanarini's work has focused on borderline personality disorder (BPD).

== Early life and education ==
Zanarini was born on July 25, 1946. In 1978, she received her Bachelor of Arts (AB) from Harvard College. She earned her Masters of Education (EdM) in 1979 and her Doctor of Education (EdD) in 1987 from the Harvard Graduate School of Education. From 1987–1988, she completed her clinical and research fellowship in psychology at McLean Hospital. She became a licensed psychologist in Massachusetts in 1992.

== Career ==
Zanarini's work in psychiatry began to gain prominence with her studies on the longitudinal course of borderline personality disorder (BPD). Her research has contributed to demonstrating that, contrary to previous beliefs, many patients with BPD can achieve significant long-term remission of symptoms. She has spent her career studying the phenomenology and long-term course of borderline personality disorder, childhood experiences of adversity, and co-occurring disorders. Additionally, Zanarini's work encompasses avoidant personality disorder. She is the founding president of the North American Society for the Study of Personality Disorders (NASSPD).

She oversees a research program at McLean Hospital in Belmont, Massachusetts. For over 10 years, Dr. Zanarini and her colleagues at McLean have followed approximately 300 former inpatients with borderline personality disorder. During the course of this study, a large majority of patients achieved remission, while over half achieved recovery—no longer meeting diagnostic criteria for borderline personality disorder as well as achieving better social and occupational functioning. Zanarini's research found that four different psychotherapies (mentalization-based treatment, transference focused psychotherapy, dialectical behavior therapy, and schema-focused therapy) were effective in improving the severity of impulses and self-destructiveness of patients with BPD.

Zanarini led the development of the McLean Screening Instrument for Borderline Personality Disorder (MSI-BPD), which is a commonly used test to screen for BPD, and the Zanarini Rating Scale for Borderline Personality Disorder (ZAN-BPD), a standardized, diagnostic rating scale designed to measure the severity and changes of BPD over time.

== Selected publications ==
Zanarini has authored or co-authored numerous publications on borderline personality disorder, including books and peer-reviewed journal articles. According to bibliometric databases, she has published over 140 articles and has an H-index of 80.

- Zanarini, M. C. (Ed.). (1997). Role of sexual abuse in the etiology of borderline personality disorder. American Psychiatric Association. https://doi.org/10.1176/ajp.155.2.302
- Zanarini, M.C. (Ed.). (2005). Borderline Personality Disorder (1st ed.). CRC Press. https://doi.org/10.1201/b1413
- Zanarini, M. C. (Ed.). (2018). In the fullness of time: Recovery from borderline personality disorder. Oxford University Press. https://doi.org/10.1093/med-psych/9780195370607.001.0001
- Zanarini, M. C., Vujanovic, A. A., Parachini, E. A., Boulanger, J. L., Frankenburg, F. R., & Hennen, J. (2003). A screening measure for BPD: the McLean Screening Instrument for Borderline Personality Disorder (MSI-BPD). Journal of Personality Disorders, 17(6), 568–573. https://doi.org/10.1521/pedi.17.6.568.25355
- Zanarini, M. C., Vujanovic, A. A., Parachini, E. A., Boulanger, J. L., Frankenburg, F. R., & Hennen, J. (2003). Zanarini Rating Scale for Borderline Personality Disorder (ZAN-BPD): a continuous measure of DSM-IV borderline psychopathology. Journal of personality disorders, 17(3), 233–242. https://doi.org/10.1521/pedi.17.3.233.22147
- Zanarini M.C., Temes C.M., Frankenburg F.R., Reich D.B., Fitzmaurice G.M.. Description and prediction of time-to-attainment of excellent recovery for borderline patients followed prospectively for 20 years. Psychiatry Res. 2018 Apr;262:40-45. https://pubmed.ncbi.nlm.nih.gov/29407567/

== Awards and honors ==
- Research.com, 2022-2023: Best Female Scientist Award
- North American Society for the Study of Personality Disorders (NASSPD), 2019: Senior Investigator Award
- International Society for the Study of Personality Disorders (ISSPD), 2017: Senior Career Award
- Educational Alliance for Borderline Personality Disorder, 2012: Distinguished Achievement in the Field of Personality Disorders
- Resource Center at NewYork-Presbyterian Hospital/Westchester Division, 2012: Distinguished Achievement in the Field of Severe Personality Disorders from the Borderline Personality Disorder
