= Erica Spatz =

American general cardiologist

- Born: Staten Island, New York, US
- Occupation: Cardiologist
- Known for: Nonprofit speciality healthcare; Heart attack research in low-income and other communities; Research in phenomena of "convenience" in medical care

Academic background
- Education: Vanderbilt University (BS); Ben-Gurion University of the Negev (MD); Yale University (MHS)

Erica S. Spatz is an American preventative cardiologist and research scientist. She is an associate professor of cardiology and chronic diseases at Yale School of Medicine. She is also Director of the Preventive Cardiovascular Health Program and the Remote Patient Monitoring program at the medical school. She is a deputy editor of the Journal of the American College of Cardiology (JACC).

== Early life and education ==
Spatz was born and raised in New York where she attended Curtis High School in Staten Island. In her senior year of high school, she received a scholarship from the Posse Foundation to attend Vanderbilt University. She completed her Bachelor of Science degree with honors in human and organizational development from Vanderbilt in 1997 and enrolled at The Medical School for International Health of the Ben-Gurion University of the Negev for her medical degree. Spatz returned to North America following her medical degree and finished her residency at Montefiore Medical Center and fellowship at Yale New Haven Hospital, obtaining a Master of Health Science from Yale School of Medicine in 2010.

== Career ==
Following her residency, Spatz was referred to the National Clinician Scholars Program (NCSP) at Yale School of Medicine, run by Harlan Krumholz. During her time with NCSP, Spatz co-founded Project Access-New Haven, a nonprofit community-based organization whose mission is to improve access to care for patients in New Haven.

=== Research ===
Spatz' research focuses on individual- and community-based strategies to prevent cardiovascular disease and advance health equity. She is a principal investigator of Pressure Check, a study comparing strategies to address disparities in hypertension control. Funded by the Patient Centered Outcomes Research Institute, the study is built on community partnerships - screening for hypertension in community organizations and connecting people with remote monitoring and telehealth care for hypertension. She is testing whether adding a community health worker to this model of care improves outcomes. She has studied why adults in the Caribbean have higher rates of Hypertension.

In 2018, she and Dr. Harlan Krumholz received funding to study a 24/7 blood pressure monitor. She and other doctors received an award from the Alpha Phi Foundation to study women's heart health.

Spatz's research also focuses on women's cardiovascular health. She was a co-Investigator on VIRGO, a study of sex differences in young adults with myocardial infarction. She published a study sponsored by Women's Health Research at Yale which showed that a sex-specific classification system could define and group types of heart attacks that were more common for women.

During the COVID-19 pandemic in North America, Spatz's Project Access-New Haven helped launch a mHealth platform to assist low-income communities with accessing their health records and increase their participation in clinical studies. She studied the impact of long-COVID, especially on older adults.

In 2025, she co-authored a study that shows a cooking-based curriculum improves nutrition education. She has provided commentary on a number of medical and health related issues, including obesity and its definition, inflammation in heart disease, and blood pressure.

== Awards ==
- Alumni Achievement Award from Posse Foundation (2009).
