= Vanity gallery =

Art gallery that charges artists fees to exhibit their work

A vanity gallery is an art gallery that charges artists fees to exhibit their work and makes most of its money from artists rather than from sales to the public. Some vanity galleries charge a lump sum to arrange an exhibition, while others ask artists to pay regular membership fees and then promise to organize an exhibition with a certain period. There is debate as to whether galleries that ask artists to contribute to expenses, e.g. by arranging for announcements of the exhibition themselves, fall into the same category.

== Derivation ==
Vanity galleries are an offshoot of cooperative galleries (also called artist-run initiatives), galleries which are operated by artists who pool their resources to pay for exhibits and publicity. Unlike cooperative galleries, which carefully jury their members, vanity galleries will exhibit anyone who pays. In 1981, Village Voice reporter Lisa Gubernick posed as an artist and "within 20 minutes" of contacting the Keane Mason Woman Art Gallery was handed a contract for "$720 for 16 feet of wall". Occasionally a vanity gallery will appear to have a selection process. This is because "if every participant is promised a one- or two-person show every two years, the number of artists on the membership roster cannot exceed the available time slots for shows."

Commercial art galleries derive their profit from sales of artwork and so usually select art and artists that they believe will sell and will enhance their gallery's reputation. They spend time and money cultivating collectors. If the artwork sells, the gallery makes a profit, and the artist is then paid.

By contrast, vanity galleries have no incentive to sell art, as they have already been paid by the artist. Vanity galleries are not selective because they do not have to be. Many professional artists recommend that new or emerging artists avoid exhibiting their work in them, primarily due to their financially predatory behavior as well as the fact that professional critics and reviewers tend to ignore them.

== See also ==
- Vanity press
- Vanity label
- Vanity award
