= Journal of Philosophy of Education =

English academic journal

- Discipline: Education, philosophy, history of the social sciences
- Language: English

Publication details
- History: 1967–present
- Publisher: Wiley-Blackwell on behalf of the Philosophy of Education Society of Great Britain (Until 2023); Oxford University Press on behalf of the Philosophy of Education Society of Great Britain (2023–present)
- Frequency: Bimonthly
- Impact factor: 0.798 (2018)

Standard abbreviations
- ISO 4: J. Philos. Educ.

Indexing
- ISSN: 0309-8249 (print); 1467-9752 (web)

Links
- Journal homepage; Online access; Online archive

The Journal of Philosophy of Education is a bimonthly peer-reviewed academic journal published by Oxford University Press on behalf of the Philosophy of Education Society of Great Britain. Until January 2023, the journal was published by Wiley-Blackwell. The journal was established in 1967 and publishes articles relating to education or educational practice from a philosophical point of view. Specific topics addressed in previous articles include politics, aesthetics, epistemology, curriculum and ethics, and historical aspects of the foregoing.

According to the Journal Citation Reports, the journal has a 2018 impact factor of 0.798, ranking it 13th out of 34 journals in the category "History of Social Sciences" and 201st out of 206 in the category "Education & Educational Research".
