= Hybrid publishing =

Type of publishing house

A hybrid press is a publishing house which can be broadly defined by its source of revenue. The revenue source of a traditional publisher is through the sale of books (and other related materials) that they publish, while the revenue of hybrid publishers comes from both book sales and fees charged to the author for the execution of their publishing services.

Hybrid publishing is a term that has emerged since the advent of the internet, to describe a type of publishing which occupies the middle ground between traditional and self-publishing. As the term is relatively new, different interpretations are used by different companies and bodies within the publishing industry, and the exact definition is still evolving. This confusion concerns many writers. In 2018, the Independent Book Publishers Association laid out nine criteria that publishers should meet to be called hybrid publishers. However this code is entirely voluntary. In 2022, the Society of Authors and the Writers Guild of Great Britain produced a report highlighting its concerns and calling for review and reform.

== Business model ==
Under the traditional publishing model, the author bears no financial risk to publish and distribute their novel in exchange for lower royalty rates. The publisher is responsible for producing and distributing the book. The publisher bears the cost of all component services, including editing, proofreading, production, marketing, sales, distribution, and wholesale costs. They recoup their investment from sales of the book. A traditional publisher will usually pay the author an advance, plus a share of royalties.

Under the hybrid publishing model, the publisher and author share the costs of publishing and distributing a novel. The publisher is then responsible for producing and distributing the book; however, the author pays a fee to cover the cost of some of the component services. A hybrid publisher will not pay the author an advance, but will typically pay the author a higher share of royalties.

== History ==
While the term "hybrid publishing" is new, the concept is not a new phenomenon. In its simplest definition, hybrid publishing is traditional publishing in which authors share some of the production costs of their own book projects, in exchange for higher royalties. Traditional publishers have been cutting these kinds of deals for decades. As traditional publishers face higher competition with more difficulty determining which books will sell and which won't, some have turned to the hybrid model to subsidize their traditional business models.

Hybrid publishing has also evolved with the introduction of print on demand (POD) services, allowing publishers to produce smaller print runs, and exercise creativity in how they produce and distribute their books. Subcategories of the hybrid model continue to emerge as the industry evolves. One such subcategory is the crowdfunding model used by publishers like Unbound who, after a book is acquired, help their authors to crowdfund their books to cover costs.

== Vanity publishing vs. hybrid publishing ==
A common criticism of hybrid publishers is that they are just vanity presses in disguise.

The essential differentiating factor between a hybrid press and a vanity press is that a true hybrid publisher undertakes editorial evaluation, setting standards in what work it accepts for publication based on quality and its merit as a sellable product, in the same way that a traditional publisher does. By contrast, a vanity press will publish any book for any author, regardless of the quality of the work or its sales potential, provided the author meets the cost of publication. An author whose work is accepted by a true hybrid publisher can therefore have more confidence that the project is worth implementing.

Another factor is that vanity presses charge a fee which covers the entire cost of production, whereas true hybrid publishers share the costs (and therefore the risk) with the author. As they then have a vested interest in the success of the novel, they will typically offer more marketing support than a vanity publisher.

== Self publishing vs. hybrid publishing ==
In self publishing, authors publish their own book, engaging professionals for specific services if needed (such as editors or cover designers). A growing number of companies offer a one-stop shop where an author can source all the services required to publish a book (sometimes called "Assisted Self-publishing"). This should not be confused with hybrid publishing.

It has been suggested that the best test for whether a company offers "Assisted Self-publishing" or "Hybrid publishing" is to apply a variant of "Yog's Law", which states the following:

- Yog’s Law: Money flows toward the writer.
- Self-Publishing Corollary to Yog’s Law: While in the process of self-publishing, money and rights are controlled by the writer.

Therefore if a company offers services to the author without claiming any rights, and allows the author to make all decisions, they are assisting the author to self-publish. Whereas if the company takes some rights, and/or takes some control of artistic decisions, they are a hybrid publisher.

However, as the hybrid publishing market is unregulated, the companies themselves are not always transparent in what they offer. It is up to the author to do their own research.

== Academic hybrid publishing ==
Hybrid models can be applied to more specific areas of publishing such as academic publishing. Traditional academic publishing is funded by the readers of the journal that publish the work, through reader and institution subscriptions and payments—whereas in open access journals, the author usually pays. For journals to attract both authors who can and cannot pay to make their work public, some adopt a hybrid model to use both payments from readers and authors to fund the publishing of scholarly works. These hybrid academic publishers let authors who have been acquired choose whether to go with the reader-funded or author-funded model. If reader-funded, the scholarly work is available to only readers willing to pay; if author-funded, the work is available openly for free.

== Examples ==
- Greenleaf Book Group
- JAMIA (academic hybrid publisher, Journal of the American Medical Informatics Association)
- Unbound (publisher)

== See also ==
- Small press
- Kindle Direct Publishing
