= Carl-Johan Forssén Ehrlin =

Swedish author

Carl-Johan Forssén Ehrlin is a Swedish author of the bestselling children's book The Rabbit Who Wants to Fall Asleep, written to help parents get their children to fall asleep. Forssén Ehrlin has a background in psychology which helped him while writing the book. The Rabbit Who Wants to Fall Asleep has topped Amazon's best seller list.
