= Posse Foundation =

American college access organization and leadership network

The Posse Foundation
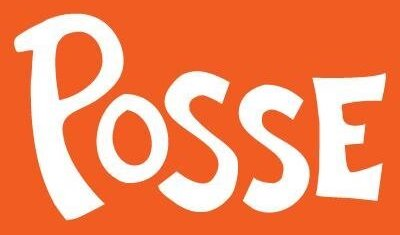
- Founded: 1989; 37 years ago
- Founder: Deborah Bial
- Location(s): 14 Wall Street, New York, New York 10005, U.S.
- Region served: United States
- Website: www.possefoundation.org

The Posse Foundation is a nonprofit organization that partners with colleges and universities in the United States to provide student scholarships and leadership training. Posse has partnered with 64 U.S. colleges and universities. The organization is centered on a cohort-based model that admits students to attend college as part of a "Posse" of 10 peers.

== History ==
Posse was founded in 1989 by Deborah Bial, first partnering with Vanderbilt University. After initially recruiting students solely from New York City, the program has expanded to 20 U.S. cities. The foundation finds diverse groups of students with academic achievements and helps to recruit and enroll in top schools. The founder, Deborah Bial, received the MacArthur "Genius" Grant in 2007 for her work with Posse. In March 2010, the foundation was one of ten organizations chosen by President Barack Obama to receive a portion of his $1.4 million Nobel Peace Prize award money.

In 2021, Posse announced the launch of the Posse Arts Program, a new initiative with the stated goal of supporting students in creative arts, conceived in collaboration with Lin-Manuel Miranda, Luis A. Miranda Jr., and the Miranda Family Fund.

== Awards and grants ==
In 2013, Google awarded Posse a Global Impact Award with a $1.2 million grant to launch the organization's Posse Veterans Program, an initiative to support post-September 11 attacks U.S. veterans in higher education and beyond.

In June 2020, Netflix selected Posse for a $350,000 grant; the company donated $5 million to organizations for Black people.

In December 2020, Posse received a $10 million gift from writer and philanthropist MacKenzie Scott.

== Notable alumni ==
- Rana Abdelhamid, former congressional candidate, founder of Malikah – Middlebury College Posse alumna
- Koby Altman, President of Basketball Operations, Cleveland Cavaliers (NBA) – Middlebury College Posse alumnus
- Shirley Collado, CEO, College Track; Ithaca College president emerita – Vanderbilt University Posse alumna
- Kameisha Jerae Hodge, writer – Lafayette College Posse alumna
- Darius Scott, musician and songwriter known professionally as DIXSON (2022 Academy Award nominee, "Be Alive") – College of Wooster Posse alumnus
- Amanda Septimo, New York State Assembly member – Vanderbilt University Posse alumna
- Erica Spatz, professor and cardiologist, Yale School of Medicine – Vanderbilt University Posse alumna
- Robin Wonsley, Minneapolis City Council member – Carleton College Posse alumna
