= Deborah Bial =

American educator

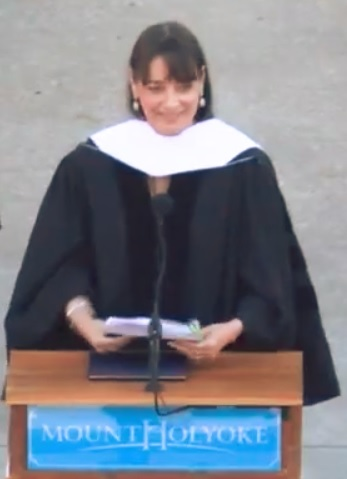
- Deborah Bial receiving an honorary Doctor of Humane Letters from Mount Holyoke College in 2014
- Born: 1965 (age 60–61); New York City, U.S.
- Education: Brandeis University; Harvard Graduate School of Education
- Awards: MacArthur Fellowship
- Scientific career
- Fields: Education
- Thesis: Alternative measures for college admissions : a relational study of a new predictor for success: the promise of the Bial Dale college adaptability index and the success of the Posse program (Harvard) (2004)

Deborah Bial (born 1965) is an American businesswoman. She is the founder and president of the Posse Foundation and a trustee of Brandeis University.

Bial is known for the concept of her foundation, which is to send groups of around ten students to collaborating colleges so that they can support each other and achieve a greater success rate. She is also known for the Bial–Dale College Adaptability Index, an activity-based test of college readiness that incorporates Lego play.

She was one of the 2007 winners of the MacArthur "Genius" awards and is a frequent speaker at college graduations.

== Life ==
Bial was born in Manhattan and grew up in Teaneck, New Jersey. Her father played bassoon and contrabassoon with the New York Philharmonic and her mother worked as a public relations professional for the New York State Psychiatric Institute. She describes her younger self as shy and not standing out in any way: "There was nothing remarkable about me growing up." Her childhood ambition was to become a writer and illustrator of children's books.

She attended Brandeis University, graduating in 1987. She worked briefly as a paralegal, and then became a counselor for the CityKids Foundation in New York. After starting Posse, she returned to graduate school, and earned master's and Ed.D. degrees from the Harvard Graduate School of Education in 1996 and 2004, respectively.

She delivered the 2012 commencement speech at her alma mater, Brandeis University. She has also been chosen as a commencement speaker at numerous colleges and universities including at DePauw University (2008), at the University of Rochester (2015), at Vassar College (2017), Kalamazoo College (2018). and at The College of Wooster (2019).

== Contributions ==
Bial's Posse Foundation sends talented young people from diverse backgrounds in "posses" of approximately ten students at a time to cooperating universities, with the intention that the students in each posse will support each other. The idea for the foundation came to Bial in 1989 when she was working as a youth counselor in New York City. One student had dropped out of college; when she asked why, he told her that he would have stayed in school if only he had his posse to support him. Based on this experience, she started her foundation as a way to create these posses as support groups for students. As well, she designed the selection process of the foundation to focus on urban students who might otherwise be overlooked by traditional college admissions processes.

As well as being known for this concept for the foundation, Bial is known for developing the Bial–Dale College Adaptability Index, a method for determining whether students are ready for college that avoids written testing in favor of interviews and activity-based assessment. It has been dubbed "the Lego test" because of its incorporation of play with Lego bricks as one of its components.

== Awards ==
Besides winning a MacArthur Fellowship in 2007, Bial has been given honorary degrees from many institutions of higher education including Brandeis University (2012), Hamilton College (2014), Mount Holyoke College (2014), Colby College (2015), Agnes Scott College (2017), Hobart and William Smith Colleges (2017), and The College of Wooster (2019).

She was one of the 2013 winners of the Harold W. McGraw Prize in Education. In 2013, the Harvard Graduate School of Education gave her their Anne Roe Award.
