= Vanity press =

Publishing house in which authors pay to have their books published

A vanity press or vanity publisher, sometimes also subsidy publisher, is a book printer that is paid by authors to self-publish their books. A vanity press charges fees in advance and does not contribute to the development of the book. It has been described as a scam. However, as the book does get printed, it does not necessarily meet the definition of actual fraud. The term vanity press is derogatory, so it is not used by the printers. Some self-publishing businesses prefer to market themselves as an independent press.

It is not to be confused with hybrid publishing, where the publisher and author collaborate and share costs and risks, or with assisted self-publishing, where the authors, sometimes styling themselves as authorpreneurs, pay various contractors and publishing services to assist them with self-publishing their own book, and retain all rights.

== Comparison ==
=== Compared to mainstream publishing ===
Mainstream publishers never charge authors to publish their books; the publisher bears all the risks of publication and pays all the costs. Because of that financial risk, mainstream publishers are extremely selective in what they will publish, and reject most manuscripts submitted to them. The high level of rejection is why some authors publish with vanity presses. James D. Macdonald says, "Money should always flow towards the author", a concept sometimes called Yog's Law.

Mainstream publishers also provide services. Ordinary author services, such as editing, book cover design, and publicity, are provided by mainstream publishers for free, whereas a vanity press charges fees for these services.

=== Compared to hybrid publishing ===
Hybrid publishing is the source of debate in the publishing industry, with some viewing hybrid publishers as vanity presses in disguise. However, a true hybrid publisher is selective in what they publish and will share the costs (and therefore the risks) with the author, whereas with a vanity press, the author pays the full cost of production and therefore carries all the risk. A vanity press has absolutely no interest in whether the book is saleable or suitable for publication.

Given the bad reputation of vanity publishing, many vanity presses brand themselves as hybrids, leading to exploitation of writers. The Society of Authors (SoA) and the Writers' Guild of Great Britain (WGGB) have called for reform of the hybrid/paid-for publishing sector. Trade unions representing 14,800 authors jointly published a report to expose widespread bad practices among companies that charge writers to publish their work while taking away their rights.

=== Compared to assisted self-publishing ===
It is often stated that many famous authors, such as Mark Twain and Jane Austen, have used vanity publishers. This is incorrect and confuses self-publishing with vanity publishing.

In a variant of Yog's law for self-publishing, author John Scalzi has proposed an alternate definition to distinguish self-publishing from vanity publishing: "While in the process of self-publishing, money and rights are controlled by the writer."

Self-publishing is distinguished from vanity publishing by the writer maintaining control of copyright as well as the editorial and publishing process, including marketing and distribution.

== Vanity publishing scams ==
Vanity presses often engage in deceptive practices or offer costly, poor-quality services with limited recourse available to the writer. In the US, these practices have been cited by the Better Business Bureau as unfavorable reports by consumers.

One common scam is when a vanity press pretends to operate a traditional publishing arm, where the publishing house bears the full cost. However, when an author submits his work, he is told it does not quite meet the standards required for traditional publishing, but that the company will still publish it if the author pays for something—engaging their professional editor, committing to buying a large number of copies of the book, or another similar excuse. In reality, the exorbitant fee charged for these services will fully cover the vanity publisher's costs for producing the book. Such a scam is a plot point in Umberto Eco's novel Foucault's Pendulum.

== Vanity publishing in other media ==
The vanity press model exists for other media such as videos, music and photography. A notable example is ARK Music Factory, which, for a fee, produced and released Rebecca Black's 2011 viral video "Friday".

Vanity academic journals also exist, often called predatory journals, which publish with little or no editorial oversight, although they may claim to be peer reviewed. One such predatory journal, the International Journal of Advanced Computer Technology, accepted for publication a paper called Get me off Your Fucking Mailing List consisting of the sentence "Get me off your fucking mailing list." repeated many times.

Vanity photography magazines often have little or no physical circulation, relying instead on the submitting photographers buying the magazine after publication. Some also charge a submission fee. Magazines such as Lucy's, Jute, and Pump – all managed by parent publisher Kavyar – often accept photograph submissions for free, or for a minimal fee to be featured on a magazine cover.

== History ==
The Abbey Press of New York (1899–1903), founded by Charles Frederick Rideal was an American vanity publisher. A suspicious fire on 7 February 1903 destroyed the company and its business records.

The term vanity press appeared in mainstream American publications at least as early as 1938. In 1941, C. M. Flumiani was sentenced to 18 months in a US prison for mail fraud, arising from his scheme that promised book promotion (a line in a catalog), expert editing (they accepted all books), and acting as agent bringing books to his own publishing houses.

By 1956, the three leading American vanity presses (Vantage Press, Exposition Press, and Pageant Press) were each publishing more than 100 titles per year.

Ernest Vincent Wright, author of the 1939 novel Gadsby, written entirely in lipogram, was unable to find a publisher for his work and ultimately chose to publish it through a vanity press.

== Examples ==
- American Biographical Institute
- Austin Macauley Publishers (previously Austin & Macauley)
- Dorrance Publishing
- Famous Poets Society
- Poetry.com, The International Library of Poetry
- Tate Publishing & Enterprises (there are at least three companies called Tate Publishing; the others include a reputable art publisher and a defunct software book publisher)
- Vantage Press

== See also ==
- Accessible publishing
- Alternative media
- Article processing charge
- Atlanta Nights
- Author mill
- Custom media
- Dōjin
- Dynamic publishing
- Independent music
- List of self-publishing companies
- Offset printing
- Online shopping
- Predatory open access publishing
- Print on demand
- Samizdat
- Self Publish, Be Happy
- Self-publishing

- Category:Self-publishing

- Small press
- Vanity award
- Vanity gallery
- Vanity label
- Variable data printing
- Web-to-print
