= Sonia Nieto =

- Born: September 25, 1943 (age 83)

Academic work
- Discipline: Professor Emerita in Language, Literacy, and Culture

Sonia Nieto is a Professor Emerita of Language, Literacy and Culture at the School of Education at the University of Massachusetts Amherst, where she focuses on the field of multiculturalism. She has won several awards in her field, including the 1997 Multicultural Educator of the Year award from the National Association for Multicultural Education, the 2005 Educator of the Year Award from the National Council of Teachers of English, and honorary doctorates from Lesley University (1999), Bridgewater State College (2004), and DePaul University (2007).

Nieto was raised and attended public school in Brooklyn, New York. She later attended St. Johns University, where she received her B.S. in Elementary Education. Later, she studied in Madrid, receiving her M.A. in Spanish and Hispanic Literature. In the following years she taught in Brooklyn and the Bronx until moving to Massachusetts and receiving her doctorate in curriculum studies with concentrations in multicultural and bilingual education, from the University of Massachusetts in 1979. In May 2017, Nieto delivered the commencement address for the Graduate School of Education at St. John's University in New York City.

== Works ==
- Nieto, Sonia (2018). Language, Culture, and Teaching: Critical Perspectives for a New Century (3rd ed.). New York: Routledge. ISBN 9781315465685. OCLC 945948341. A compilation of previously published journal articles and book chapters.
- ——; Bode, Patty (2012). Affirming Diversity: The Sociopolitical Context of Multicultural Education (6th ed.). Boston: Pearson Education, Inc. ISBN 9780131367340. OCLC 704907645.
- —— (2010). The Light in Their Eyes: Creating Multicultural Learning Communities (Tenth anniversary ed.). New York: Teachers College Press. ISBN 9780807750544. OCLC 965457387.
- —— (2002). What Keeps Teachers Going?. New York: Teachers College Press. ISBN 9780807743126. OCLC 471662211.

As editor

- Nieto, Sonia, ed. (2010). Language, Culture, and Teaching: Critical Perspectives (2nd ed.). New York: Routledge. ISBN 9780415999687. OCLC 277196027.
- Nieto, Sonia, ed. (2005). Why We Teach Now. New York: Teachers College Press. ISBN 9780807755877. OCLC 898092719.
- Nieto, Sonia, ed. (2000). Puerto Rican Students in U.S. Schools. Mahwah, N.J.: Lawrence Erlbaum Associates. ISBN 9780805827651. OCLC 710022856.

== Sources ==
- "About Sonia Nieto". Why We Teach. Archived from the original on 10 March 2009.
