= Poetry.com =

Domain name

poetry.com
- Website type: Poetry-sharing
- Available in: English
- Website: https://www.poetry.com

Poetry.com is a domain name that has historically been used for poetry-sharing in various forms. The domain is currently owned by STANDS4, a company founded in 2001.

== History of domain ownership ==
Poetry.com was historically run by a Maryland-based company called The International Library of Poetry starting in 1997. On March 7, 2009, Lulu.com purchased the Poetry.com domain and renamed the site Lulu Poetry. In May 2011, Scott Tilson and Jeffrey Franz, operating under the name Newton Rhymes, LLC. repurchased Poetry.com from Lulu.com for an undisclosed amount. In January 2012, Poetry.com was relaunched with a database of archived poems. In April 2018, Poetry.com went offline without explanation. In January 2021, Poetry.com was acquired by STANDS4.

== Criticism of International Library of Poetry ==
Watermark Press was based in Owings Mills, Maryland. They operated under the aliases of National Library of Poetry, International Library of Poetry, International Poetry Hall of Fame, Pegasus Press, International Society of Poets, Birthwrites, American Literary Press, and poetry.com. The company was founded in 1983 by Jeffrey Franz and Howard Friedman, directed by Scott Tilson, and its spokesperson was Howard Ely. In the United Kingdom, they operated as Noble House Publishing, Poetry in Print, and their spokesperson was Nigel Hillary. They advertised contests in newspapers and through unsolicited mass mailings, promising thousands in prize money. In 1997 they started soliciting submissions online at poetry.com. Between 1983 and 2004 it received submissions from over 5 million poets. Between 1996 and 2001 Watermark Press published over 250 poetry anthologies. Each anthology contained over 1,500 poems.

The company earned income by selling their anthologies to the contributors instead of distributing to the wider public through bookstores, promising poets award plaques if they paid to attend a convention whose admission fee was $595. The company charged extra for printing biographical information, society membership, and charged up to $1,500 to publish an individual poet's collection. The founders stated that they were "not in the business of sending rejection slips," and only discarded poetry submissions with offensive language instead of judging submissions on artistic merit.

The organization has received criticism from legitimate poetry organizations including the Academy of American Poets and Poets & Writers magazine. Comedian Dave Barry wrote a column in 1994, revealing that he submitted a poem satirizing the Library's publication practices. In 1998 writer Mary Freed tested their submission standards by sending in lines from Allen Ginsberg, and reported her findings in Wind magazine. Literature professor Jenijoy LaBelle conducted a similar test for plagiarism by submitting excerpts from Emily Dickinson in 1996. Writer Marvin Petal, submitted poems under the pun pseudonyms Vera Stewpet and E.D. Yotts, and published an article in the July 1996 edition of Modern Maturity magazine, warning writers of the company's poor selection standards. In 1998 the news program 20/20, in order to investigate the Library's publication selection methods had an entire class of elementary students submit poetry to the competition, and every student was accepted.

The Library of Congress lists Poetry.com as a vanity publisher. The Better Business Bureau also classified the business as a vanity publisher and a "ploy service" and noted that the quality of the poetry submitted to them "does not appear to be a significant consideration for selection for publication." Poetry.com was not an accredited business with the Better Business Bureau, which gave the business an "F" rating. By 2001 the Better Business Bureau in Maryland had received nearly 400 complaints, and between 1995 and 1998 the Maryland Attorney General's office reported 158 complaints were filed about the company's business practices. In 2004, the New York State Consumer Protection Board launched an investigation into ILP, which it said "takes advantage of people both emotionally and financially," but it suspended the investigation due to a shortage of complaints.

Science Fiction and Fantasy Writers of America, Inc. (SFWA) have criticized the International Library of Poetry's business model, describing its practices as "deceptive and misleading" in that they misrepresented their activities as a contest based on the quality of poetry submitted, whereas in fact the quality had little or no influence on the outcome. It was also accused of describing the anthologies it published as a "real literary credit that poets can be proud of" while simultaneously producing anthologies that were available on special order only and which were full of poor quality poetry. When poets receive their purchased volumes they are given a discount to ILP's convention and are told they are "semi-finalists" for a grand prize. All conference attendees are semi-finalists. Semi-finalists for their poetry contest have also discovered their anthologies are different from other volumes sent to other semi-finalists, featuring the buyer's work near the front with work from other semi-finalists missing.
