= Philosophy of Education Society of Great Britain =

The Philosophy of Education Society of Great Britain was established in 1964 'to promote the development and teaching of the rigorous philosophical study of educational questions'. Professor Louis Arnaud Reid was the first President. The current chair of the society is Professor Paul Standish, head of the Centre for Philosophy at the UCL Institute of Education.

The Society has a regional network and its members are from both the UK and overseas. Membership is open to individuals who have been or are engaged in some form of study of the philosophy of education. It also holds regular events, including an annual conference and publishes the Journal of Philosophy of Education and the booklet series IMPACT.
