= Deborah Britzman =

American psychoanalyst and academic

Academic background
- Education: B.A., M.A., Ed.D, University of Massachusetts in Amherst
- Thesis: Reality and ritual: an ethnographic study of student teachers

Deborah P. Britzman FRSC is a practicing psychoanalyst and professor at York University. Britzman's research connects psychoanalysis with contemporary pedagogy, teacher education, social inequality, identity formation, queer theory, problems of intolerance and historical crisis.

== Early life and education ==
Britzman completed her undergraduate degree in teaching at the University of Massachusetts in Amherst. She then taught high school English for seven years. Britzman completed a master's degree in Reading and Anthropology at the University of Massachusetts and earned her doctoral degree in ethnographic research in 1985.

== Career ==
Britzman was hired as an assistant professor at Binghamton University. Seven years after she began teaching at Binghamton, she moved to Canada to teach at York University in Toronto, where she has been since 1992.

Britzman's book Freud and Education, published in 2011 by Routledge Press explores key controversies of education through a Freudian approach. It defines how fundamental Freudian concepts such as the psychical apparatus, the drives, the unconscious, and the development of morality are related to the field of education.

In 2013 Britzman was working on a three-year research project titled "the emotional world of teaching: A psychoanalytic inquiry." The project is a study of the psychology of teaching and mental health. She was later named a Fellow of the Royal Society of Canada. Two years later, she was awarded the 2015 Hans W. Loewald Memorial Award from the International Forum for Psychoanalytic Education.

In 2016, she was the recipient of the Lifetime Achievement Award by the Canadian Association for Teacher Education. The next year, she was named a Tier 1 York Research Chair in Pedagogy and Psycho-Social Transformations. She was also recognized by York as a University Research Leader.

== Awards ==
Britzman was the first Faculty of Education member to be honoured with the title of York University Distinguished Research Professor.

- 2017 Tier I York Research Chair in Pedagogy and Psycho-Social Transformations
- 2016 Canadian Association for Teacher Education Lifetime Achievement Award
- 2015 Hans W. Loewald Memorial Award
- 2009 Gary A. Olsen Award, presented by JAC- a journal of rhetoric, culture and politics
- 2007 Distinguished Psychoanalytic Educator's Award
- 2006 York University Distinguished Research Professor
- 2003 James and Helen Meritt Distinguished Service Award to the Philosophy of Education from Northern Illinois University
- 1999 The Ontario Confederation of University Faculty Associations Teaching Award
- 1999 The Faculty of Graduate Studies Teaching Award, York University

== Books ==
- Britzman, D. P. (2021). Anticipating Education: Concepts for imagining pedagogy with psychoanalysis. Meyers Educational Press.
- Britzman, D. P. (2016). Melanie Klein: Early Analysis, Play, and the question of freedom. Springer Press.
- Britzman, D. P. (2011). Freud and Education. Routledge.
- Britzman, D. P. (2009). The Very Thought of Education: Psychoanalysis and the impossible professions. SUNY Press
- Britzman, D. P. (2006). Novel Education: Psychoanalytic Studies on learning and not learning. Peter Lang
- Britzman, D. P. (2003). Practice Makes Practice: Revised edition. SUNY Press
- Britzman, D. P. (2003). After-Education: Anna Freud, Melanie Klein, and psychoanalytic histories of learning. SUNY Press
- Britzman, D. P. (1998). Lost subjects, contested objects: toward a psychoanalytic inquiry of learning. SUNY Press
