= Attention deficit hyperactivity disorder controversies =

Controversies surrounding the topic of ADHD's nature, diagnosis, and treatment

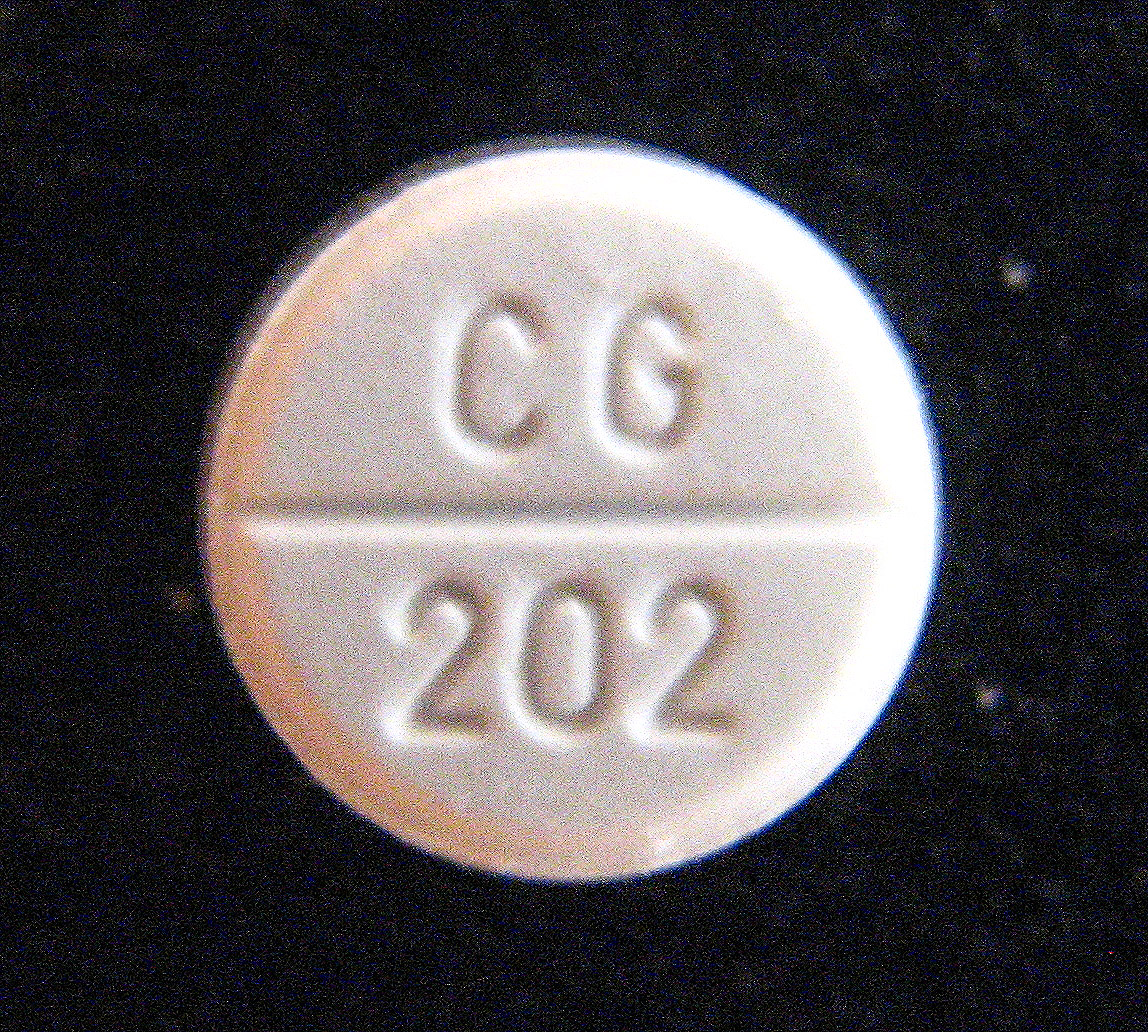
Despite their safety and effectiveness in treating ADHD symptoms, the use of methylphenidate and other stimulant medications is frequently a topic of public controversy.

The nature of attention deficit hyperactivity disorder (ADHD), its diagnosis, and its treatment have been controversial since the 1970s. Academic authors disagree as to the validity of ADHD as a defined disorder. The controversies also involve clinicians, teachers, policymakers, parents, and the media. Positions range from the view that ADHD is within the normal range of behavior to the hypothesis that ADHD is a genetic condition. Other areas of controversy include the use of stimulant medications in children, the method of diagnosis, and the possibility of overdiagnosis. In 2009, the National Institute for Health and Care Excellence, while acknowledging the controversy, stated that the current treatments and methods of diagnosis are based on the dominant view of the academic literature.

With differing rates of diagnosis across countries, states within countries, races, and ethnicities, some suspect factors other than the presence of the symptoms of ADHD are playing a role in diagnosis, although the prevalence of ADHD is consistent internationally. Some sociologists consider ADHD to be an example of the medicalization of deviant behavior, that is, turning the previously non-medical issue of school performance into a medical one. Most healthcare providers accept ADHD as a genuine disorder, at least in the small number of people with severe symptoms. Among healthcare providers the debate mainly centers on diagnosis and treatment in the much greater number of people with mild symptoms.

== Status as a disorder ==
According to the Diagnostic and Statistical Manual of Mental Disorders, Fifth Edition (DSM-5), the leading authority in the US on clinical diagnosis, ADHD is a neurodevelopmental disorder with a prevalence rate in most cultures of about 5% in children and 2.5% in adults. Today, the existence of ADHD is widely accepted, but controversy around the disorder has existed since at least the 1970s. According to the DSM-5, symptoms must be present before age 12, but it is not uncommon for ADHD to continue into adulthood. Parents and educators sometimes still question a perceived over-diagnosis in children due to overlapping symptoms with other mental disabilities, and the effectiveness of treatment options, especially the overprescription of stimulant medications. However, according to sociology professor Vincent Parrillo, "Parent and consumer groups, such as CHADD (Children and Adults with Attention Deficit Hyperactivity Disorder), tend to support the medical perspective of ADHD."

In 2009, the British Psychological Society and the Royal College of Psychiatrists, in collaboration with the National Institute for Health and Care Excellence (NICE), released a set of diagnosis and treatment guidelines for ADHD. These guidelines reviewed studies by Ford et al. that found that 3.6% of boys and 0.85% of girls in Britain qualified for a diagnosis of ADHD using the American DSM-IV criteria. The guidelines go on to state that the prevalence drops to 1.5% when using the stricter criteria for the ICD-10 diagnosis of hyperkinetic disorder, used mainly in Europe.

A systematic review of the literature in 2007 found that the worldwide prevalence of ADHD was 5.29%, and that there were no significant differences in prevalence rates between North America and Europe. The review did find differences between prevalence rates in North America and those in Africa and the Middle East, but cautioned that this may be due to the small number of studies available from those regions.

== Causes ==
The pathogenesis of ADHD is not wholly clear, however a large body of scientific evidence supports that it is caused by a complex mixture of genetic, pre-natal and early post-natal environmental factors.

=== ADHD as a biological difference ===
Large, high quality research has found small differences in the brain between ADHD and non-ADHD patients. Jonathan Leo and David Cohen, critics who reject the characterization of ADHD as a disorder, contended in 2003 and 2004 that the controls for stimulant medication usage were inadequate in some lobar volumetric studies, which makes it impossible to determine whether ADHD itself or psychotropic medication used to treat ADHD is responsible for decreased thickness observed in certain brain regions. They believe many neuroimaging studies are oversimplified in both popular and scientific discourse and given undue weight despite deficiencies in experimental methodology. Many studies and meta-analyses have demonstrated differences in multiple aspects of brain structure and function.

ADHD is highly heritable: twin studies suggest that genetics explain 70% to 80% of the variation of ADHD. There is also strong evidence to support genetic-environment interactions with some fetal and early post-natal environmental factors. However, some have questioned whether a genetic connection exists as no single gene has been found – this is known as the missing heritability problem, which ADHD shares with many other heritable human traits such as schizophrenia. In 2000, Dr. Joseph Glenmullen stated that "no claim of a gene for a psychiatric condition has stood the test of time, in spite of popular misinformation. Although many theories exist, there is no definitive biological, neurological, or genetic etiology for 'mental illness'." Authors of a review of ADHD etiology in 2004 noted: "Although several genome-wide searches have identified chromosomal regions that are predicted to contain genes that contribute to ADHD susceptibility, to date no single gene with a major contribution to ADHD has been identified." However, several large studies and reviews provide strong support that ADHD is polygenic in most cases, caused by a complex interaction between multiple genes – there is no single gene which would cause the majority of ADHD cases.

=== Social construct theory ===
Some social constructionist theories of ADHD reject the dominant medical consensus that ADHD has a distinct pathophysiology and genetic components. Many social constructionists trenchantly question deterministic views of behaviour, such as those views sometimes put forth within behavioural/abnormal psychology and the biological sciences. Concerns have been raised over the threshold at which symptoms are pathologized, and how strongly social constructs surrounding the symptoms and diagnosis of ADHD may differ between cultures. The social construction theory of ADHD argues that attention deficit hyperactivity disorder is not necessarily an actual pathology, but that an ADHD diagnosis is a socially constructed explanation to describe behaviors that simply do not meet prescribed social norms.

Some proponents of the social construct theory of ADHD seem to regard the disorder as genuine, though over-diagnosed in some cultures. These proponents cite as evidence that the DSM IV, favored in the United States for defining and diagnosing mental illness, arrives at levels of ADHD three to four times higher than criteria in the ICD 10, the diagnostic guide favored by the World Health Organization. A popular proponent of this theory, Thomas Szasz, has argued that ADHD was "invented and not discovered."

Psychiatrists Peter Breggin and Sami Timimi oppose pathologizing the symptoms of ADHD. Sami Timimi, who is a child and adolescent psychiatrist with the NHS, argues that ADHD is not an objective disorder but that western society creates stress on families which in turn suggests environmental causes for children expressing the symptoms of ADHD. They also believe that parents who feel they have failed in their parenting responsibilities can use the ADHD label to absolve guilt and self-blame. Timimi's view has been heavily criticized by psychiatrist and ADHD expert Russell Barkley, a strong proponent of ADHD as an independent pathology and of medicating children for ADHD symptoms.

A common argument against the medical model of ADHD asserts that, while the traits that define ADHD exist and may be measurable, they lie within the spectrum of normal healthy human behaviour and are not dysfunctional. As Thomas Szasz puts it, everyone has problems and difficulties that should be categorized as "problems of living", not mental illnesses or diseases. However, by definition, in order to diagnose with a mental disorder, symptoms must be interpreted as causing a person distress or be especially maladaptive. In the United States, the Diagnostic and Statistical Manual (DSM-IV) requires that "some impairment from the symptoms is present in two or more settings" and that "there must be clear evidence of significant impairment in social, school, or work functioning" for a diagnosis of ADHD to be made.

In this view, in societies where passivity and order are highly valued, those on the active end of the active-passive spectrum may be seen as problems. Medically defining their behaviour (through medical labels such as ADHD) serves the purpose of removing blame from those causing the problem. However, strict social constructions views are controversial, due to a number of studies that cite significant psychological and social differences between those diagnosed with the disorder, and those who are not. The specific reasons for these differences are not certain, and this does not suggest anything other than a difference in behavior. Studies have also shown neurological differences, but whether this signifies an effect rather than a cause is unknown. Such differences could also be attributed the drugs commonly prescribed to people with this disorder. Studies have also been able to differentiate ADHD from other psychiatric disorders in its symptoms, associated features, life course, and comorbidity.

Gerald Coles, an educational psychologist and formerly an associate professor of clinical psychiatry at Robert Wood Johnson Medical School and the University of Rochester who has written extensively on literacy and learning disabilities, asserts that there are partisan agendas behind the educational policy-makers and that the scientific research that they use to support their arguments regarding the teaching of literacy are flawed. These include the idea that there are neurological explanations for learning disabilities. Gerald Coles argues that school failure must be viewed and treated in the context of both the learning environment and the child's individual abilities, behavior, family life, and social relationships. He then presents a new model of learning problems, in which family and school environments are the major determinants of academic success. In this interactive paradigm, the attitudes and methods of education are more important than inherent strengths or deficits of the individual child.

== Diagnosis ==
=== Methods of diagnosis ===
Since the early 2000s, research on the functioning of the brain has been conducted to help support the idea that Attention Deficit Hyperactivity Disorder is an executive dysfunction issue. The brains of males and females are showing differences, which could potentially help explain why ADHD presents differently in boys and girls. The current method of diagnosis made is using the DSM-5, along with a possible physical and visual examination.

=== Over- and under-diagnosis ===
Overdiagnosis typically refers to the phenomenon of children without ADHD being systematically erroneously diagnosed with ADHD. These instances are termed as false positives. However, the "presence of false positives alone does not indicate overdiagnosis". There may be evidence of overdiagnosis if inaccuracies are shown consistently in the accepted prevalence rates or in the diagnostic process itself. "For ADHD to be overdiagnosed, the rate of false positives (i.e., children inappropriately diagnosed with ADHD) must substantially exceed the number of false negatives (children with ADHD who are not identified or diagnosed)." Children aged 8 to 15 years living in the community indicated an ADHD prevalence rate of 7.8%. However, only 48% of the ADHD sample had received any mental health care over the past 12 months.

Evidence also exists of possible differences of race and ethnicity in the prevalence of ADHD. Some believe this may be due to different perceptions of what qualifies as disruptive behavior, inattention and hyperactivity.

It is argued that over-diagnosis occurs more in well-off or more homogeneous communities, whereas under-diagnosis occurs more frequently in poorer and minority communities due to lack of resources and lack of financial access. Those without health insurance are less likely to be diagnosed with ADHD. It is further believed that the "distribution of ADHD diagnosis falls along socioeconomic lines", according to the amount of wealth within a neighborhood. Therefore, the difficulty of applying national, general guidelines to localized and specific contexts, such as where referral is unavailable, resources are lacking or the patient is uninsured, may assist in the establishment of a misdiagnosis of ADHD.

Development can also influence perception of relevant ADHD symptoms. ADHD is viewed as a chronic disorder that develops in childhood and continues into adulthood. However, some research shows a decline in the symptoms of ADHD as children grow up and mature into adulthood. As children move into the stage of adolescence, the most common reporters of ADHD symptoms, parents and teachers, tend to focus on behaviors affecting academic performance. Some research has shown that the primary symptoms of ADHD were strong discriminators in parent ratings, but differed for specific age groups. Hyperactivity was a stronger discriminator of ADHD in children, while inattentiveness was a stronger discriminator in adolescents.

Issues with comorbidity are another possible explanation in favor of the argument of overdiagnosis. As many as 75% of diagnosed children with ADHD meet criteria for some other psychiatric diagnosis. Among children diagnosed with ADHD, about 25% to 30% have anxiety disorders, 9% to 32% have depression, 45% to 84% have oppositional defiant disorder, and 44% to 55% of adolescents have conduct disorder. Learning disorders are found in 20% to 40% of children with ADHD.

Another possible explanation of over-diagnosis of ADHD is the "relative-age effect", which applies to children of both sexes. Younger children are more likely to be inappropriately diagnosed with ADHD and treated with prescription medication than their older peers in the same grade. Children who are almost a year younger tend to appear more immature than their classmates, which influences both their academic and athletic performance.

The debate of underdiagnosis, or giving a "false negative", has also been discussed, specifically in literature concerning ADHD among adults, girls and underprivileged communities. It is estimated that in the adult population, rates of ADHD are somewhere between 4% and 6%. However, as little as 11% of these adults with ADHD actually receive assessment, much less any form of treatment. Between 30% and 70% of children with ADHD report at least one impairing symptom of ADHD in adulthood, and 30% to 50% still meet the diagnostic criteria for ADHD.

Research on gender differences also reveals an argument for underdiagnosis of ADHD among girls. The ratio for male-to-female is 4:1 with 92% of girls with ADHD receiving a primarily inattentive subtype diagnosis. This difference in gender can be explained, for the majority, by the different ways boys and girls express symptoms of this particular disorder. Typically, females with ADHD exhibit less disruptive behaviors and more internalizing behaviors. Girls tend to show fewer behavioral problems, show fewer aggressive behaviors, are less impulsive, and are less hyperactive than boys diagnosed with ADHD. These patterns of behavior are less likely to disrupt the classroom or home setting, therefore allowing parents and teachers to easily overlook or neglect the presence of a potential problem. The current diagnostic criteria appear to be more geared towards symptoms more common in males than in females, and the ADHD characteristics of men have been over-represented. This leaves many women and girls with ADHD neglected.

As stated previously, underdiagnosis is also believed to be seen in more underprivileged communities. These communities tend to be poorer and inhabit more minorities. More than 50% of children with mental health needs do not receive assessment or treatment. Access to mental health services and resources differs on a wide range of factors, such as "gender, age, race or ethnicity and health insurance". Therefore, children deserving of an ADHD diagnosis may never receive this confirmation and are not identified or represented in prevalence rates.

In 2005, 82% of teachers in the United States considered ADHD to be over diagnosed while 3% considered it to be under diagnosed. In China 19% of teachers considered ADHD to be over diagnosed while 57% considered it to be under diagnosed.

The British Psychological Society said in a 1997 report that physicians and psychiatrists should not follow the American example of applying medical labels to such a wide variety of attention-related disorders: "The idea that children who don't attend or who don't sit still in school have a mental disorder is not entertained by most British clinicians." The NICE, in collaboration with others, release guidelines for the diagnosis and treatment of ADHD. An update was last published in 2019.

There have been notable differences in the diagnosis patterns of birthdays in school-age children. Those born relatively younger to the school starting age than others in a classroom environment are shown to be more likely diagnosed with ADHD. Boys who were born in December in which the school age cut-off was December 31 were shown to be 30% more likely to be diagnosed and 41% to be treated than others born in January. Girls born in December had a diagnosis percentage of 70% and 77% treatment more than ones born the following month. Children who were born at the last 3 days of a calendar year were reported to have significantly higher levels of diagnosis and treatment for ADHD than children born at the first 3 days of a calendar year. The studies suggest that ADHD diagnosis is prone to subjective analysis.

== Treatment ==
ADHD management recommendations vary by country and usually involves some combination of counseling, lifestyle changes, and medications. The British guideline only recommends medications as a first-line treatment in children who have severe symptoms and for them to be considered in those with moderate symptoms who either refuse or fail to improve with counseling. Canadian and American guidelines recommend that medications and behavioral therapy be used together as a first-line therapy, except in preschool-aged children.

=== Stimulants ===
The US National Institute of Mental Health recommends stimulants for the treatment of ADHD, and states that, "under medical supervision, stimulant medications are considered safe". A 2007 drug class review found no evidence of any differences in efficacy or side effects in the stimulants commonly prescribed.

Methylphenidate and amphetamine are the most common stimulants used for treating ADHD. Studies have shown that providing low doses of methylphenidate and amphetamine improves individuals' basal arousal levels. Current research indicates that contrary to previous indications, stimulants do not "target" the prefrontal cortex but rather as substances that cross the blood-brain barrier, generally act on brain networks that control wakefulness and reward while also increasing blood pressure and the risk of adverse cardiac events by a rate of approximately 4% per year

==== Adverse effects ====
Some parents and professionals have raised questions about the side effects of drugs and their long-term use. Magnetic resonance imaging studies suggest that long-term treatment with amphetamine or methylphenidate decreases abnormalities in brain structure and function found in subjects with ADHD, and improves function of the right caudate nucleus. On February 9, 2006, the U.S. Food and Drug Administration voted to recommend a "black-box" warning describing the cardiovascular risks of stimulant drugs used to treat ADHD. Subsequently, the USFDA commissioned studies which found that, in children, young adults, and adults, there is no association between serious adverse cardiovascular events (sudden death, myocardial infarction, and stroke) and the medical use of amphetamine or other ADHD stimulants.

The effects of amphetamine and methylphenidate on gene regulation are both dose- and route-dependent. Most of the research on gene regulation and addiction is based upon animal studies with intravenous amphetamine administration at very high doses. The few studies that have used equivalent (weight-adjusted) human therapeutic doses and oral administration show that these changes, if they occur, are relatively minor. The long-term effects on the developing brain and on mental health disorders in later life of chronic use of methylphenidate is unknown. Despite this, between 0.51% to 1.23% of children between the ages of 2 and 6 years take stimulants in the US. Stimulant drugs are not approved for this age group.

In individuals who experience sub-normal height and weight gains during stimulant therapy, a rebound to normal levels is expected to occur if stimulant therapy is briefly interrupted. The average reduction in final adult height from continuous stimulant therapy over a 3-year period is 2 cm. Amphetamines doubles the risk of psychosis compared to methylphenidate in ADHD patients.

==== Effectiveness ====
The use of stimulant medication for treatment of attention-deficit hyperactivity disorder (ADHD) is well-researched and considered one of the most effective treatments in psychiatry. A 2015 study examined the long-term effects of stimulant medication for ADHD, and reported that stimulants are a highly effective treatment for ADHD in the short term when used properly. The findings for long term effects were limited. However, this study concluded that stimulant medication is a safe and effective treatment for ADHD.

A 2017 review assessed the advantages and disadvantages of both behavioral therapies and pharmacological interventions for the treatment of ADHD. It was reported that stimulants are a very effective treatment during the time period in which they are taken. While the short-term benefits were clearly demonstrated, the long-term benefits were less clear.

Another 2013 review aimed to identify the direct and indirect impacts of stimulant medication on the long-term outcomes of adults with ADHD. It was found that medication was significantly more effective than placebos for treating adults. Additionally, after conducting longitudinal and cross-sectional studies, it was reported that stimulant treatment for ADHD is tolerated well, and has long term benefits.

Reviews of clinical stimulant research have established the safety and effectiveness of long-term amphetamine use for ADHD. An evidence review noted the findings of a randomized controlled trial of amphetamine treatment for ADHD in Swedish children following 9 months of amphetamine use. During treatment, the children experienced improvements in attention, disruptive behaviors, and hyperactivity, and an average change of +4.5 in IQ. It was noted that the population in the study had a high rate of comorbid disorders associated with ADHD, and suggested that other long-term amphetamine trials in people with fewer associated disorders could find greater functional improvements.

==== Treatment non-adherence and acceptability ====
The rates of treatment discontinuation are higher than the rates of ADHD patients that receive no treatment at all; few studies present evidence that adherence to ADHD treatment is occurring at high rates with low acceptability. A literature review on empirical studies from 1997 to 2014 revealed a lack of research on adult non-adherence, however there is a large body of research on children and adolescents who discontinue treatment. Some of the common reasons for stopping treatment includes the idea that it is not needed or does not reduce the symptoms of ADHD, as well as reported adverse drug effects like weight and appetite loss, sleeping difficulties, combined with other medically diagnosed conditions.

Research has shown that adherence and acceptability improvements are possible with accessible and convenient community-based treatment options. Some schools in the United States have attempted to make it mandatory for hyperactive children to receive medication based treatment in order to attend classes, however the United States Senate passed a bill in 2005 against this practice. The Schedule II medication surveillance program is indicated to be a major factor in patient non-adherence, with patients reporting feeling dehumanized and criminalized by government surveillance.

==== Potential for misuse ====
Aside from its medical usage, methylphenidate has gained popularity as a "study drug" or for a feeling similar to that of cocaine. A 2005 study of 100 college students who used methylphenidate found that 30% claimed to use methylphenidate for studying purposes, and these students were less likely to partake in intranasal usage of the substance. The other 70% were using it recreationally accompanied with other illicit substances, and were more likely to use methylphenidate intranasally. A 2003 study found that non-prescription use within the last year by college students in the US was 4.1%.

A 2008 systematic review of 21 studies, encompassing more than 100000 children and young adults, found that between 16% and 29% of students who were prescribed stimulants reported diverting their prescriptions at least once. It also found that within a single year, between 5% and 9% of grade/primary and high school children and between 5% and 35% of college students had used nonprescribed stimulants. Most often their motivation was to concentrate, improve alertness, get high, or to experiment. Stimulant medications may be resold by patients as recreational drugs, and methylphenidate is used as a study aid by some students without ADHD. The review also concluded that "individuals who report ADHD symptoms are at highest risk for misusing and diverting stimulants".

In 2009, 8% of United States Major League Baseball players had been diagnosed with ADHD, making the disorder particularly common among this population. The increase coincided with the League's 2006 ban on stimulants, which raised concern that some players were mimicking or falsifying the symptoms or history of ADHD to get around the ban on the use of stimulants in sport.

=== Role and views of Scientology ===
An article in the Los Angeles Times stated that "the uproar over Ritalin [methylphenidate] was triggered almost single-handedly by the Scientology movement." The Citizens Commission on Human Rights, an anti-psychiatry group formed by Scientologists in 1969, conducted a major campaign against Ritalin in the 1980s and lobbied the US Congress for an investigation into Ritalin. Scientology publications claimed that the "real target of the campaign" was "the psychiatric profession itself" and said that the campaign "brought wide acceptance of the fact that (the commission) [sic] and the Scientologists are the ones effectively doing something about ... psychiatric drugging".

== Conflicts of interest ==
In 2008 five pharmaceutical companies received warning from the FDA regarding false advertising and inappropriate professional slide decks related to ADHD medication. In September 2008 the FDA sent notices to Novartis Pharmaceuticals and Johnson & Johnson regarding advertisings of Focalin XR and Concerta in which they overstated products' efficacies. A similar warning was sent to Shire plc with respect to Adderall XR.

In 2008, it was revealed that Joseph Biederman of Harvard, a frequently cited ADHD expert, failed to report to Harvard that he had received $1.6 million from pharmaceutical companies between 2000 and 2007. E. Fuller Torrey, executive director of the Stanley Medical Research Institute which finances psychiatric studies, said "In the area of child psychiatry in particular, we know much less than we should, and we desperately need research that is not influenced by industry money."

In 2014, Keith Conners, one of the early advocates for the recognition of the disorder, spoke out against overdiagnosis in a New York Times article. In contrast, a 2014 peer-reviewed medical literature review indicated that ADHD is underdiagnosed in adults.

== Stigma ==
Russell Barkley believes labeling is a double-edged sword; there are many pitfalls to labeling but by using a precise label, services can be accessed. He also believes that labeling can help the individual understand and make an informed decision how best to deal with the diagnoses using evidence-based knowledge. Studies also show that the education of the siblings and parents has at least a short-term impact on the outcome of treatment. Barkley states this about ADHD rights: "... because of various legislation that has been passed to protect them. There are special education laws with the Americans with Disabilities Act, for example, mentioning ADHD as an eligible condition. If you change the label, and again refer to it as just some variation in normal temperament, these people will lose access to these services, and will lose these hard-won protections that keep them from being discriminated against." Psychiatrist Harvey Parker, who founded CHADD, states, "we should be celebrating the fact that school districts across the country are beginning to understand and recognize kids with ADHD, and are finding ways of treating them. We should celebrate the fact that the general public doesn't look at ADHD kids as 'bad' kids, as brats, but as kids who have a problem that they can overcome". However, children may be ridiculed at school by their peers for using psychiatric medications including those for ADHD. Russell Barkley's rhetoric about ADHD is commonly cited by people with ADHD as a primary driver of stigma, however, with his "doom and gloom" rhetoric and aggressive focus on deficit and total, irrepararable incapacity cited as a driver of job loss and unavailability of promotions for which the person is well-qualified.

== Politics and media ==
=== North America ===
In 1998, the US National Institutes of Health (NIH) released a consensus statement on the diagnosis and treatment of ADHD. The statement, while recognizing that stimulant treatment is controversial, supports the validity of the ADHD diagnosis and the efficacy of stimulant treatment. It found controversy only in the lack of sufficient data on long-term use of medications and in the need for more research in many areas.

The validity of the work of many of the ADHD experts (including Biederman) has been called into question by Marcia Angell, former editor in chief of the New England Journal of Medicine, in her book review, "Drug Companies & Doctors: A Story of Corruption."

=== Europe ===
The UK's National Institute for Health and Care Excellence (NICE) concluded that while it is important to acknowledge the body of academic literature which raises controversies and criticisms surrounding ADHD for the purpose of developing clinical guidelines, it is not possible to offer alternative methods of assessment (i.e. ICD 10 and DSM IV) or therapeutic treatment recommendations. NICE stated that this is because the current therapeutic treatment interventions and methods of diagnosis for ADHD are based on the dominant view of the academic literature. NICE further concluded that despite such criticism, ADHD represented a valid clinical condition, with genetic, environmental, neurobiological and demographic factors. The diagnosis has a high level of support from clinicians and medical authorities.

Baroness Susan Greenfield wanted a wide-ranging inquiry in the UK House of Lords into the dramatic increase in the diagnosis of ADHD in the UK and its possible causes. This followed a BBC Panorama program which distorted research in order to suggest that medications are not effective in the long term. In 2010, the BBC Trust criticized the 2007 Panorama program for how it summarized the research, as the research had found that there was a significant improvement over time.

Other notable individuals in the UK have made controversial statements about ADHD. Terence Kealey, a clinical biochemist and vice-chancellor of University of Buckingham, has stated his belief that ADHD medication is used to control unruly boys and girls behavior.

Norwegian National Broadcasting (NRK) broadcast a short television series in early 2005 on the increase in the use of Ritalin and Concerta for children. Sales were six times higher in 2004 than in 2002. The series included the announcement of a successful group therapy program for 127 unmedicated children aged four to eight, some with ADHD and some with oppositional defiant disorder.

== See also ==
- Chemical imbalance theory
- Ethical problems using children in clinical trials
- The Gene Illusion
- Hunter vs. farmer hypothesis
- Low arousal theory – alternate theory of ADHD
- Neurodiversity
- Nootropic
