= Scientific controversy =

Issues of substantial disagreement among scientists

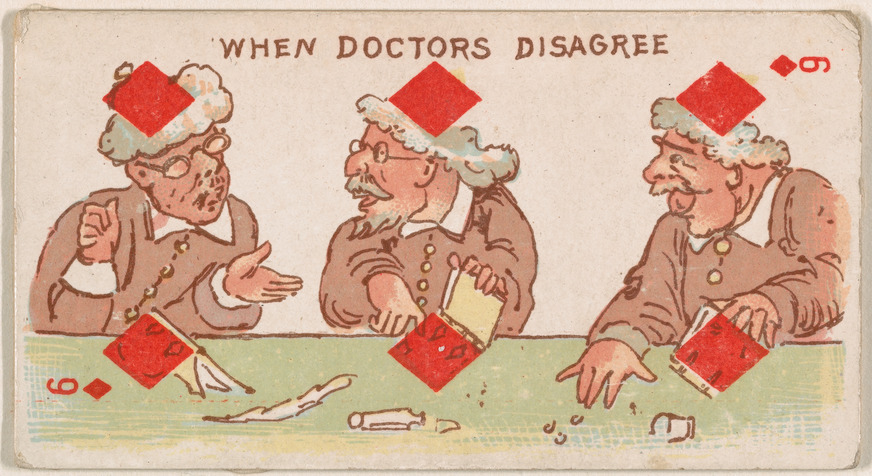

Sustained scientific controversy, sometimes scientific debate is any substantial disagreement among scientists. A scientific controversy may involve issues such as the interpretation of data, which ideas are most supported by evidence, and/or which ideas are most worth pursuing.

Controversies between scientific and non-scientific ideas are not within the realm of science and are not true scientific controversies. A genuine scientific controversy entails an ongoing discussion within the wider scientific community. Well known examples include the debate over the existence of the atom that lasted until the turn of the 20th century, the Bohr–Einstein debates, the linguistics wars, and the debate over the causes of ADHD.

== Intra-academic debate ==
Constructive debate within the scientific community is widely viewed as essential to the progress of science as a whole. Critique and debate leads to an environment in which ideas are rigorously and extensively cross-tested and in which mistakes which one individual might not catch are able to be justified by another, and additionally, the environment can push the development of new research programs, discovery of new evidence, and the forward movement of scientific consensus.

Debate among scientists within a primarily academic setting can take one of many forms: two important forms, for example, are writing/review and conference discussions. Academic review and critique often occurs through technical review in journals; more uncommonly, external platforms such as PubPeer are utilized.

When considering the scope of an individual paper, we can say that scientific critique often is prompted by one of a few originating concerns: often the concern is methodological, that is, concerned with the technical validity of the paper; oftentimes it is ethical, dealing with the implications of the paper or disputing the ethicality of its research methods; and other times, the concern is with possible scientific fraud.

== Science-related public debate ==
=== Origin ===
Science-related public debates can have their origin either in publicized intra-academic debates or debates involving forces, institutions, groups or ideas from outside of mainstream science- such as, for example, the Scopes trial.

Throughout the 20th century, this would prominently occur via radio or television, however with the advent of the Internet, the substrate of these debates has radically shifted. Online sources such as social media, video content, podcasts and science communicators now play a much greater role in the publicization of scientific debates or controversies.

=== Narrativization of Science ===
Due to the often highly contentious nature of science-related public debates and the ways in which they interact with individuals existing ways of interacting with the world or belief systems, science-related public debates tend to be presented in a highly narratival form. Even if the quality of contentiousness is not met entirely, to engage viewers, science-related controversies need to be phrased in a way such that captivates people, leading to the issue being presented as a story, often involving conflicting sides or worldviews and key actors or characters evaluated within the central conflict. When properly handled, this can exceptionally engage audiences. If improperly done, this can misrepresent or oversimplify scientific issues or place pseudoscientific ideas and real science on a perceived equal playing field.

Individuals, personalities, science communicators and public figures often play a large role in narrativizations of scientific controversy. Individual figures and recognizable popular communicators used as representative forces or consistent presenters of the issues often make complex debates more digestible and engaging for public audiences.

== See also ==
- Scientific dissent
- Biopsychiatry controversy
- List of scientific priority disputes
- "Teach the controversy" – Discovery Institute campaign to promote intelligent design
