= Hunter versus farmer hypothesis =

Hypothesis about ADHD

The hunter versus farmer hypothesis is a proposed explanation for the nature of attention-deficit hyperactivity disorder (ADHD). It was first suggested by radio host Thom Hartmann in his book Attention Deficit Disorder: A Different Perception.

The hypothesis notes that humans spent most of their evolutionary history in hunter-gatherer societies, and it argues that ADHD represents a lack of adaptation to farming societies. Hartmann first developed the idea as a mental model after his own son was diagnosed with ADHD, stating, "It's not hard science, and was never intended to be."

The hypothesis seeks to explain the "hyperfocus" aspect of ADHD, the distractibility factor in ADHD, the short attention span individuals with ADHD have for subjects that do not interest them (which may or may not trigger hyperfocus), and various other characteristics related to ADHD (namely, hyperactivity and impulsivity).

A key component of the hypothesis is that the proposed “hyperfocus” aspect of ADHD is a benefit under appropriate circumstances and that, in the hunter-gatherer cultures that preceded farming societies, hunters needed hyperfocus more than gatherers.

== Hypothesis claims ==
The hunter versus farmer hypothesis proposes that the high frequency of ADHD in contemporary settings "represents otherwise normal behavioral strategies that become maladaptive in such evolutionarily novel environments as the formal school classroom." One example, such as migration in the hunter-gatherer society, is that some of these hunter-gatherers that naturally predisposed to these various amounts of this same gene may have value in certain kinds or qualities of social groups. It was also stated that the lack of "hyperfocus" should not be the only dichotomy of "farmers versus hunter-gatherers" that was identified in Hartmann's theory.

Hartmann claims that most or all humans were nomadic hunter-gatherers for hundreds of thousands of years, but that this standard gradually changed as agriculture developed in most societies, and more people worldwide became farmers. Over many years, most humans adapted to farming cultures, but Hartmann speculates that people with ADHD retained some of the older hunter characteristics.

== Scientific basis ==
=== Hyperfocus ===
Although Hartmann noted that his proposed model is not based on hard science, several researchers have nonetheless used the hypothesis as a working model to explain the origin of ADHD. Specifically, experts have claimed that hyperfocusing is an anachronistic behavioral trait that has become maladaptive. These experts note that hyper focusing was advantageous to those in hunter societies, as it conferred superb hunting skills and a prompt response to predators, but that it is not suited to modern life in an industrial society.

Glickman & Dodd (1998) found that adults with self-reported ADHD scored higher than other adults on self-reported ability to hyper-focus on "urgent tasks", such as last-minute projects or preparations. Adults in the ADHD group were uniquely able to postpone eating, sleeping and other personal needs and stay absorbed in the "urgent task" for an extended time.

=== Positive/negative gene selection ===
Genetic variants (such as the DRD4 7R allele, as well as others on DRD4 and DRD2) conferring susceptibility to ADHD are very frequent—implying that the trait had provided selective advantage in the past. However, "it is unlikely that the observed bias towards nonsynonymous amino-acid changes has been achieved only by positive selection favoring the DRD4 7R allele because the bias can be found not only in VNTR motifs of the DRD4 7R allele but also in those of the other alleles", observed by more recent research—the DRD4 7R allele had no evidence for recent positive selection. Furthermore, a 2020 study found that ADHD allele frequency has been decreasing for up to 35,000 years, indicating negative selection. These conclusions, however, are still compatible with the theory: "Overall, our results are compatible with the mismatch theory for ADHD but suggest a much older time frame for the evolution of ADHD-associated alleles compared to previous hypotheses."

=== Frequency of ADHD in nomadic tribes ===
A 2008 New Scientist article by Ewan Callaway reports that research of ADHD and related traits in different cultures offers some support for the hunter versus farmer hypothesis. According to evolutionary anthropologist Ben Campbell of the University of Wisconsin–Milwaukee, studies of the Ariaal, an isolated nomadic group in Kenya, suggest that hyperactivity and impulsivity—key traits of ADHD—have distinct advantages to nomadic people. Additionally, nomadic Ariaal have high rates of a genetic mutation linked to ADHD, while more settled Ariaal populations have lower rates of this mutation. Henry Harpending of the University of Utah reports that with this genetic mutation, "You probably do better in a context of aggressive competition."

A genetic variant associated with ADHD has been found at higher frequency in more nomadic populations and those with more of a history of migration. Consistent with this, the health status of nomadic Ariaal men was higher if they had the ADHD associated genetic variant (7R alleles), whereas in recently sedentary (non-nomadic) Ariaal, those with 7R alleles seemed to have slightly worse health.

== See also ==
- Continuum concept
- Neurodiversity
- Controversy about ADHD
- Adult ADHD

== Sources ==
- Hartmann, Thom, Attention Deficit Disorder: A Different Perception
