= The Gene Illusion =

Book by Jay Joseph

- Cover of the first edition
- Author: Jay Joseph
- Language: English
- Subject: Psychiatry
- Published: 2003
- Publication place: United Kingdom
- Media type: Print

The Gene Illusion is a 2003 book by clinical psychologist Jay Joseph, in which the author challenges the evidence underlying genetic theories in psychiatry and psychology. Focusing primarily on twin and adoption studies, he attempts to debunk the methodologies used to establish genetic contributions to schizophrenia, criminal behaviour, and IQ. In the nature and nurture debate on the causes of mental disorders, Joseph's criticisms of genetic research in psychiatry have found their place among those who argue that the environment is overwhelmingly the cause of these disorders, particularly with psychiatry critic Jonathan Leo, and with Oliver James. It was also reviewed favorably in Choice and the British Journal of Learning Disabilities. Some of the conclusions of The Gene Illusion have been criticized in reviews of the book.

== See also ==
- Anti-psychiatry
- Attention-deficit hyperactivity disorder controversies
- Biological psychiatry
- Biopsychiatry controversy
- Causes of schizophrenia
- Inheritance of intelligence
- Mad in America
