= Jay Joseph =

American clinical psychologist and author

- Born: James Jay Joseph; April 13, 1959 (age 67)
- Education: University of California, Berkeley; New College of California; California School of Professional Psychology
- Known for: Criticism of human behavior genetics
- Scientific career
- Fields: Clinical psychology
- Thesis: A critical analysis of the genetic theory of schizophrenia (2000)
- Doctoral advisor: Samuel Gerson

James Jay Joseph (born April 13, 1959) is an American clinical psychologist and author. He practices psychology in the San Francisco Bay Area. He is known for his criticisms of behavior genetics and twin studies in psychology and psychiatry. His view, as he articulated in his 2003 book The Gene Illusion, is that such research is so flawed as to render all of its results completely meaningless.

== Biography ==
Joseph received his undergraduate education from the University of California, Berkeley. He went on to receive his master's degree from the New College of California in 1994 and his Psy.D from the California School of Professional Psychology in 2000. He received his license to practice psychology in California in 2003. In 2014 he published The Trouble with Twin Studies, which argued that research based on twin studies was highly flawed and could not be used to prove heritability of traits, as they fail to adequately control for environmental factors, as well as accusations of ethics violations in research practices. The book was negatively reviewed by one psychologist, Eric Turkheimer, who argued that twin study research was valid.

== Books ==
- The Gene Illusion (Algora, 2004)
- The Missing Gene (Algora, 2006)
- The Trouble with Twin Studies (Routledge, 2015)
- Schizophrenia and Genetics (Routledge, 2023)
