= Absent-mindedness =

Inattentive or forgetful behavior

Absent-mindedness is a mental state wherein a person is forgetfully inattentive. It is the opposite mental state of mindfulness.

Absent-mindedness is often caused by things such as boredom, sleepiness, rumination, distraction, or preoccupation with one's own internal monologue. When experiencing absent-mindedness, people exhibit signs of memory lapses and weak recollection of recent events.

Absent-mindedness can usually be a result of a variety of other conditions often diagnosed by clinicians such as attention deficit hyperactivity disorder (ADHD) and depression. In addition to absent-mindedness leading to an array of consequences affecting daily life, it can have more severe, long-term problems.

== Conceptualization ==
Absent-mindedness seemingly consists of lapses of concentration or "zoning out". This can result in lapses of short or long-term memory, depending on when the person in question was in a state of absent-mindedness. Absent-mindedness also relates directly to lapses in attention. Schachter and Dodsen of the Harvard Psychology department say that in the context of memory, "absent-mindedness entails inattentive or shallow processing that contributes to weak memories of ongoing events or forgetting to do things in the future".

== Causes ==
Though absent-mindedness is a frequent occurrence, there has been little progress made on what the direct causes of absent-mindedness are. However, it tends to co-occur with ill health, preoccupation, and distraction.

The condition has three potential causes:

1. a low level of attention ("blanking" or "zoning out");
2. intense attention to a single object of focus (hyperfocus) that makes a person oblivious to events around them; or
3. unwarranted distraction of attention from the object of focus by irrelevant thoughts or environmental events.

Absent-mindedness is also noticed as a common characteristic of personalities with schizoid personality disorder.

== Consequences ==
Lapses of attention are clearly a part of everyone's life. Some are merely inconvenient, such as missing a familiar turn-off on the highway, while some are extremely serious, such as failures of attention that cause accidents, injury, or loss of life. Sometimes, lapses of attention can lead to a significant impact on personal behaviour, which can influence an individual's pursuit of goals. Beyond the obvious costs of accidents arising from lapses in attention, there are lost time; efficiency; personal productivity; and quality of life. These can also occur in the lapse and recapture of awareness and attention to everyday tasks. Individuals for whom intervals between lapses are very short are typically viewed as impaired. Despite the prevalence of attentional failures in everyday life, relatively little work has been done to directly measure individual differences in everyday errors arising from propensities for failures of attention. Absent-mindedness can also lead to bad grades at school, boredom, and depression.

== Absent-mindedness in popular culture ==
The absent-minded professor is a stock character often depicted in fictional works, usually as a talented academic whose focus on academic matters leads them to ignore or forget their surroundings. This stereotypical view can be traced back as far as the philosopher Thales, who it is said, "walked at night with his eyes focused on the heavens and, as a result, fell down a well". One classic example of this is in the Disney film The Absent-Minded Professor made in 1963 and based on the short story "A Situation of Gravity", by Samuel W. Taylor. Two examples of this character portrayed in more modern media include doctor Emmett Brown from Back to the Future and Professor Farnsworth of Futurama.

In literature, "The Absent-Minded Beggar" is a poem by Rudyard Kipling, written in 1899, and was directed at the absent–mindedness of the population of Great Britain in ignoring the plight of their troops in the Boer War. The poem illustrated the fact that soldiers who could not return to their previous jobs needed support, and the need to raise money to support the fighting troops. The poem was also set to music by Gilbert & Sullivan and a campaign raised to support the British troops, especially on their departure and return, and the sick and wounded. Franz Kafka also wrote "Absent-minded Window-gazing", one of his short-story titles from Betrachtung.

Other characters include:

- Amberglas from The Seven Towers by Patricia Wrede.
- Alicja, a character from Joanna Chmielewska's novels. Alicja is described by the author as "the epitome of absent-mindedness".
- Caboose, from the web series Red vs. Blue by RoosterTeeth.
- Hay Lin is an absent-minded character from the Italian comic book series W.I.T.C.H., later made into an animated Disney production.
- Professor Calculus in The Adventures of Tintin comics.

== Measurement and treatment ==
Absent-mindedness can be avoided or fixed in several ways. Although it can not be accomplished through medical procedures, it can be accomplished through psychological treatments. Some examples include: altering work schedules to make them shorter, having frequent rest periods and utilizing a drowsy-operator warning device.

Absent-mindedness and its related topics are often measured in scales developed in studies to survey boredom and attention levels. For instance, the Attention-Related Cognitive Errors Scale (ARCES) reflects errors in performance that result from attention lapses. Another scale, called the Mindful Attention Awareness Scale (MAAS) measures the ability to maintain a reasonable level of attention in everyday life. The Boredom Proneness Scale (BPS) measures the level of boredom in relation to the attention level of the subject.

== Mistakes and related phenomena ==
Absent-mindedness can lead to automatic behaviors or automatisms. Additionally, absent-minded actions can involve behavioral mistakes. A phenomenon called Attention-Lapse Induced Alienation occurs when a person makes a mistake while absent-minded. The person then attributes the mistake to their hand rather than their self, because they were not paying attention.

Another related topic to absent-mindedness is daydreaming. It may be beneficial to differentiate between these two topics. Daydreaming can be viewed as a coping or defense mechanism. As opposed to inattentiveness, daydreaming is a way for emotions to be explored and even expressed through fantasy. It may even bring attention to previously experienced problems or circumstances. It is also a way to bring about creativity.

== See also ==
- Attention deficit hyperactivity disorder (ADHD)
- Absent-minded professor
- Habit (psychology)
- Human reliability
- Hyperfocus
- Mind-wandering
- Attentional shift
- Default mode network
- Highway hypnosis
