= Pastoralism =

Branch of agriculture concerned with raising livestock

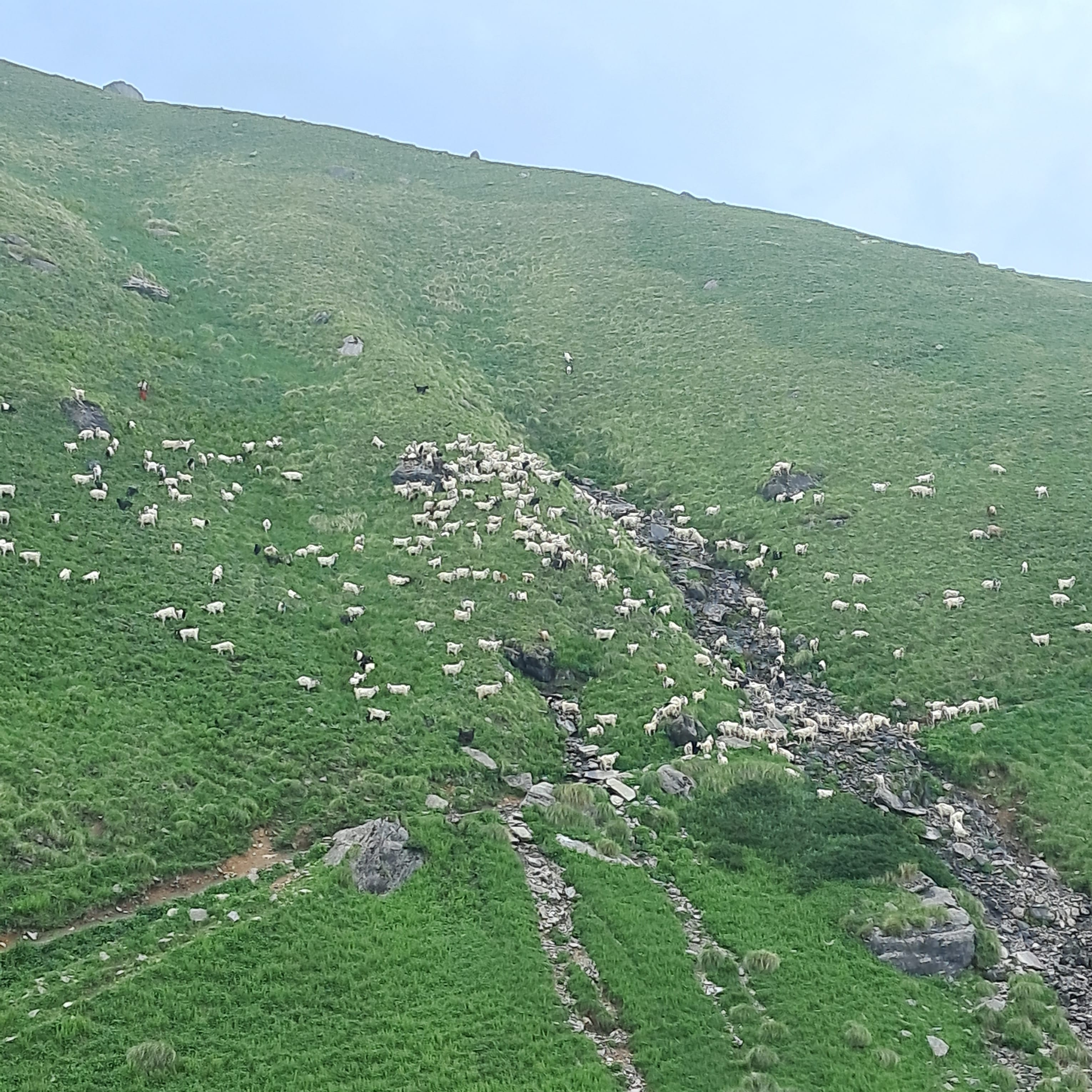
Pastoral site at Tangnu village, Rohru in Himachal Pradesh, India

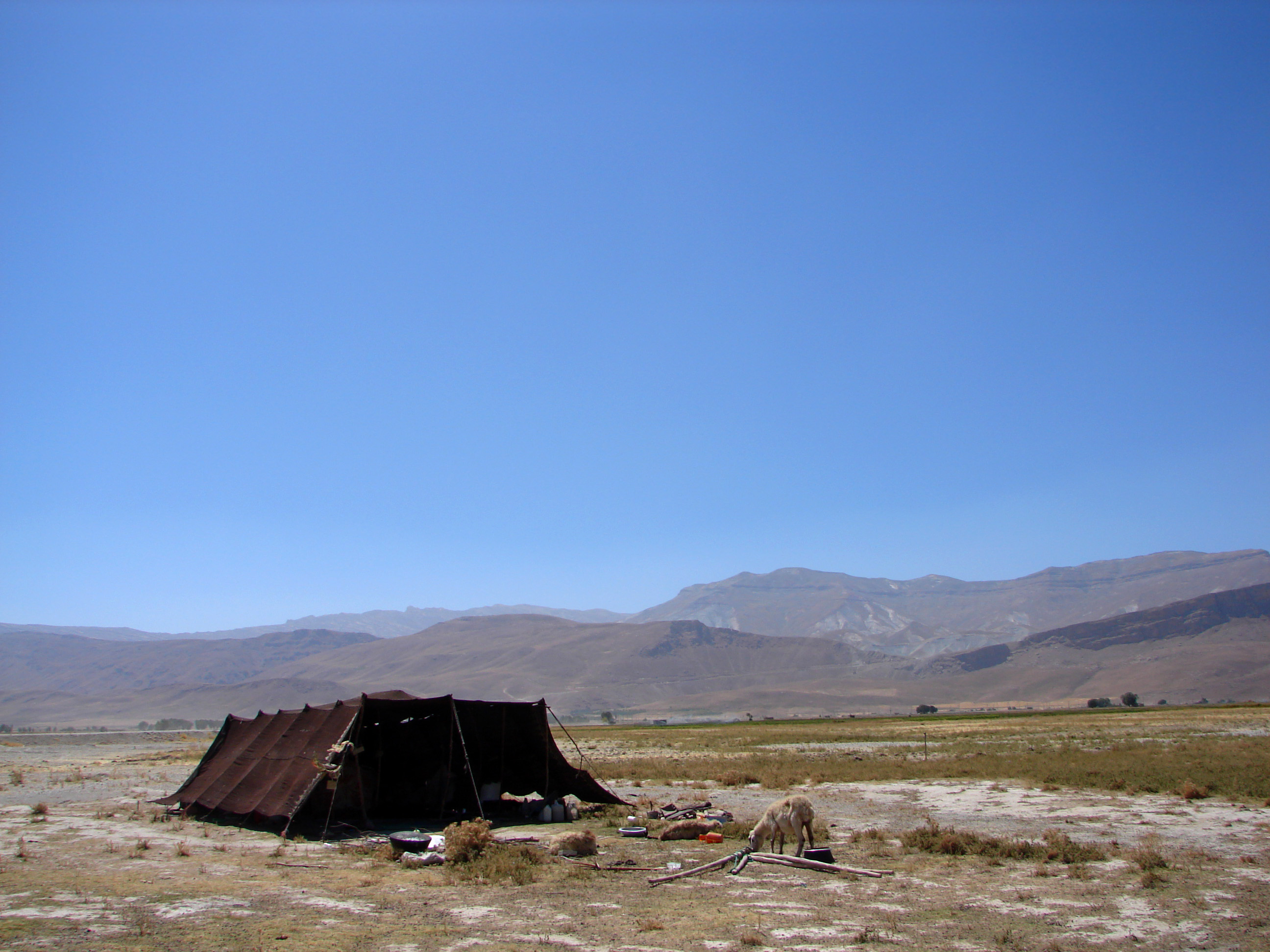
A catt of the Bakhtiari people, Chaharmahal and Bakhtiari Province, Iran

Global map of pastoralism, its origins and historical development

Pastoralism is a form of animal husbandry where domesticated animals (known as "livestock") are released onto large vegetated outdoor lands (pastures) for grazing, historically by nomadic people who moved around with their herds. The animal species involved are cattle, camels, goats, yaks, llamas, reindeer, horses, and sheep. Those who practice pastoralism are called "pastoralists".

Pastoralism is practised in various ways around the world, generally where environmentally affected characteristics such as aridity, poor soils, cold or hot temperatures, and lack of water make crop-growing difficult or impossible. Operating in more extreme environments with more marginal lands means that pastoral communities are very vulnerable to the effects of global warming.

Pastoralism remains a way of life in many geographic areas, including Africa, the Tibetan Plateau, the Eurasian Steppes, the Andes, Patagonia, the Pampas, Australia and many other places. As of 2019, between 200 million and 500 million people globally practiced pastoralism, and 75% of all countries had pastoral communities.

Pastoral communities have different levels of mobility. The enclosure of common lands has led to sedentary pastoralism becoming more common as the hardening of political borders, land tenures, expansion of crop farming, and construction of fences and dedicated agricultural buildings all reduce the ability to move livestock around freely, leading to the rise of pastoral farming on established grazing-zones (sometimes called "ranches"). Sedentary pastoralists may also raise crops and livestock together in the form of mixed farming, for the purpose of diversifying productivity, obtaining manure for organic farming, and improving pasture conditions for their livestock. Mobile pastoralism includes moving herds locally across short distances in search of fresh forage and water (something that can occur daily or even within a few hours); as well as transhumance, where herders routinely move animals between different seasonal pastures across regions; and nomadism, where nomadic pastoralists and their families move with the animals in search for any available grazing-grounds—without much long-term planning. Grazing in woodlands and forests may be referred to as silvopastoralism.

Pastoralism is a way of turning uncultivated plants like wild grasses into food. In many places, grazing herds on savannas and in woodlands can help maintain the biodiversity of such landscapes and prevent them from evolving into dense shrublands or forests. Grazing and browsing at the appropriate levels often can increase biodiversity in Mediterranean climate regions. Pastoralists shape ecosystems in different ways: some communities use fire to make ecosystems more suitable for grazing and browsing animals.

== Origins ==
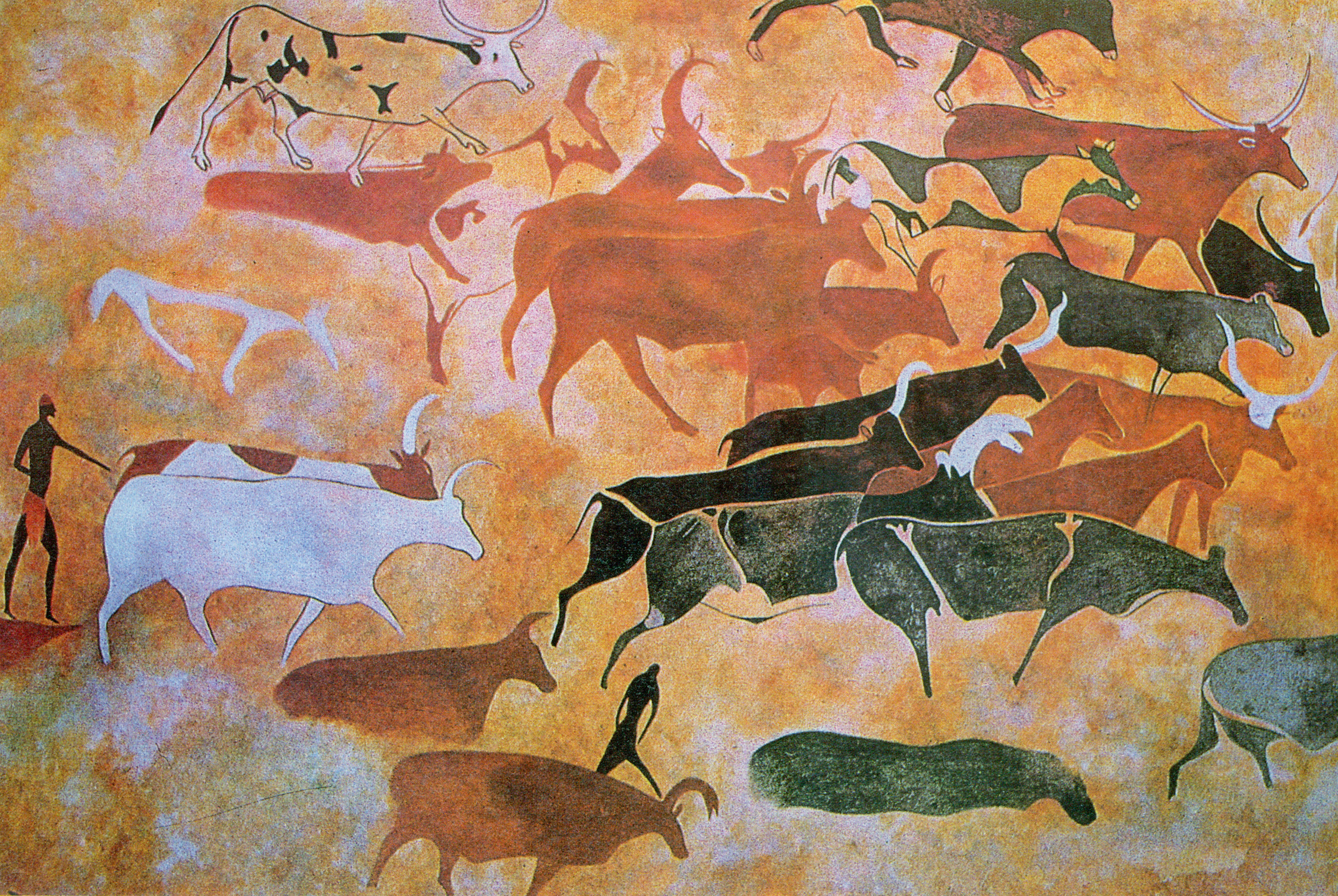
Saharan rock art from the Pastoral Period at Tassili n'Ajjer in the central Sahara, showing numerous pastoral scenes with cattle and herders

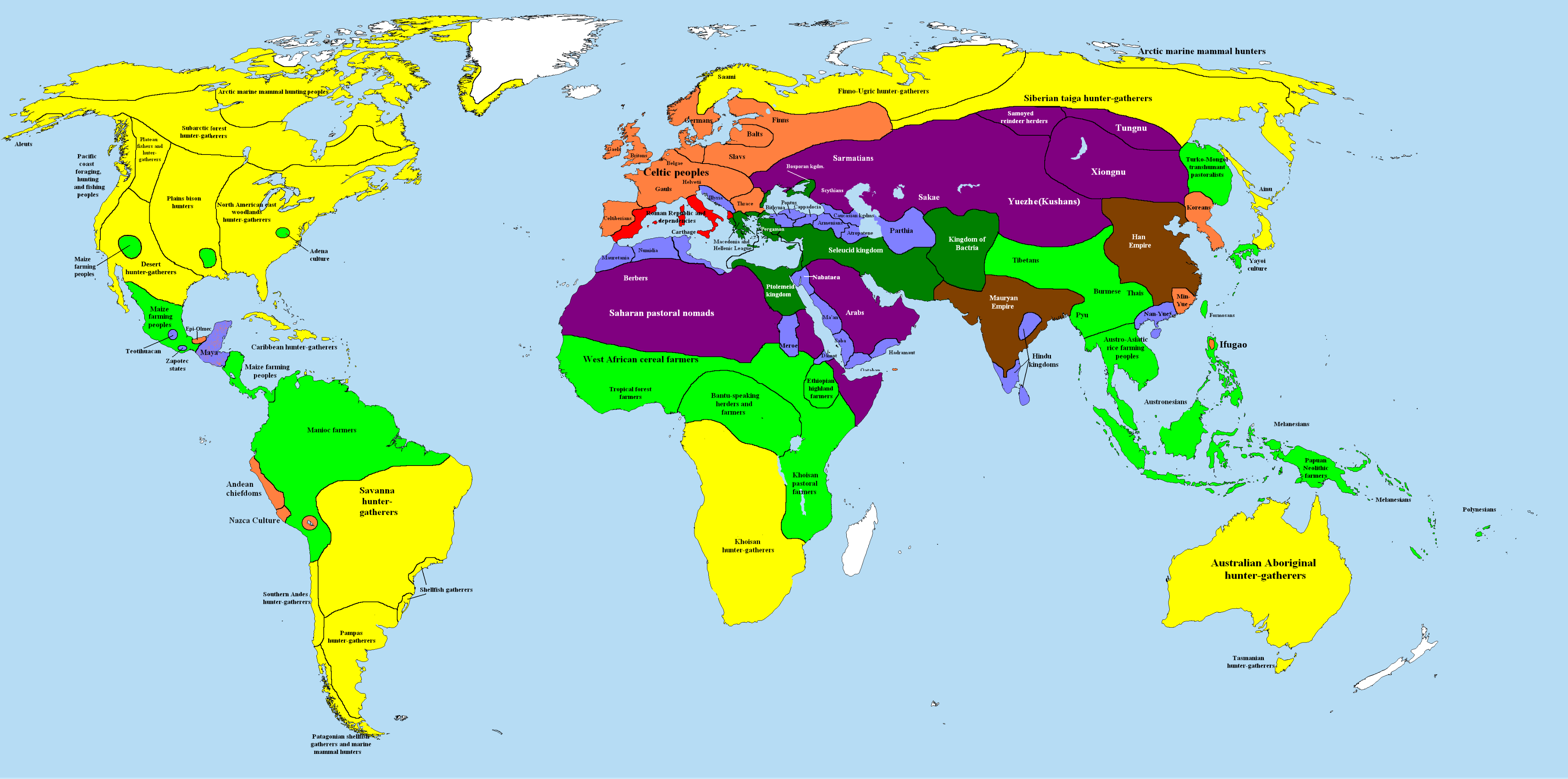
Overview map of the world in 200 BC: Sarmatians, Saka, Yuezhi, Xiongnu and other nomadic pastoralists

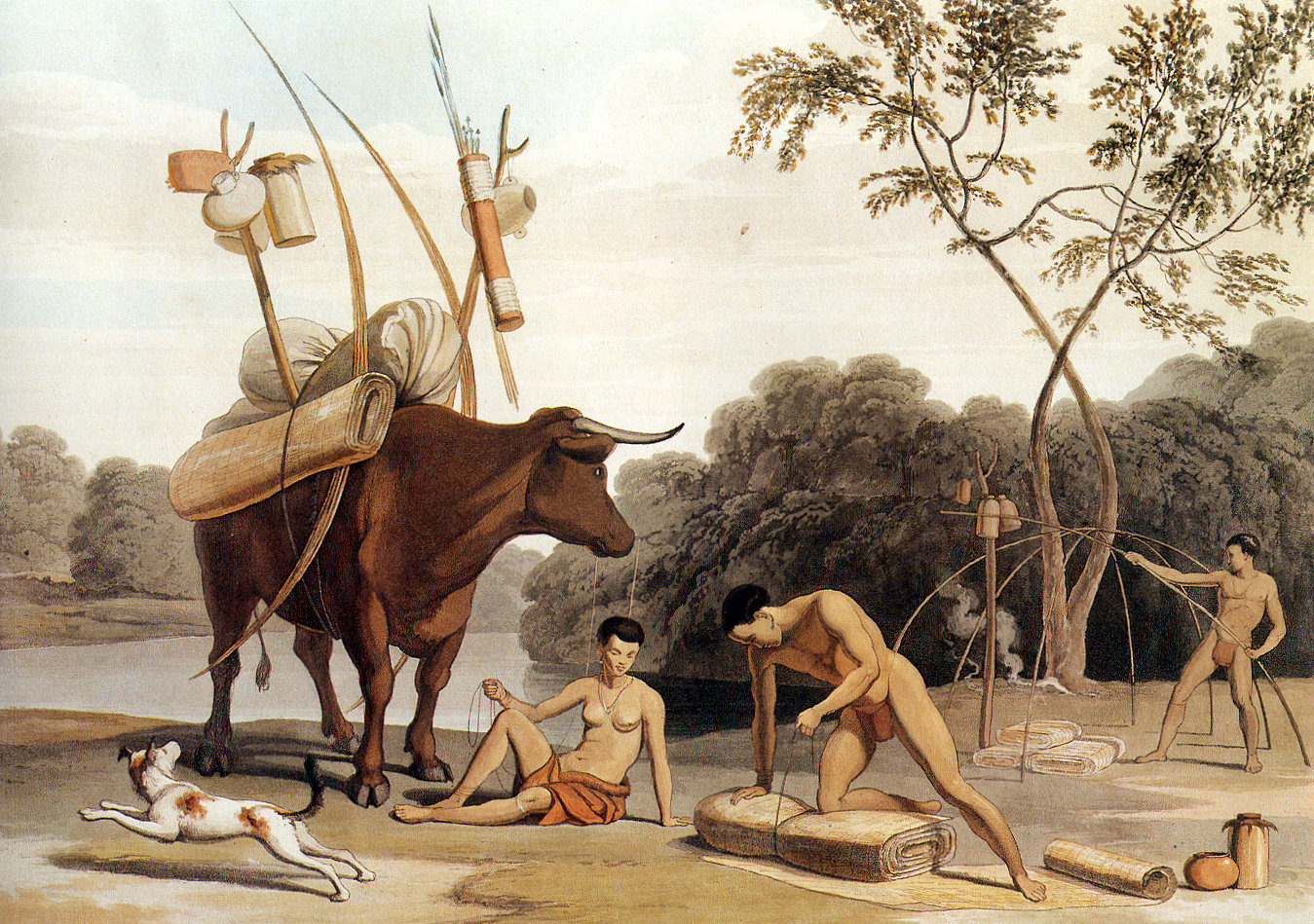
Khoikhoi dismantling their huts, preparing to move to new pastures. Aquatint by Samuel Daniell (1805).

One theory suggests that pastoralism developed from mixed farming. Bates and Lees proposed that the incorporation of irrigation into farming resulted in specialization. Advantages of mixed farming include reducing risk of failure, spreading labour, and re-utilizing resources. The importance of these advantages and disadvantages to different farmers or farming societies differs according to the sociocultural preferences of the farmers and the biophysical conditions as determined by rainfall, radiation, soil type, and disease. The increased productivity of irrigation agriculture led to an increase in population and an added impact on resources. Bordering areas of land remained in use for animal breeding. This meant that large distances had to be covered by herds to collect sufficient forage. Specialization occurred as a result of the increasing importance of both intensive agriculture and pastoralism. Both agriculture and pastoralism developed alongside each other, with continuous interactions.

An alternative theory suggests that pastoralism evolved from hunting and gathering. Hunters of wild goats and sheep were knowledgeable about herd mobility and the needs of animals. Such hunters were mobile and followed the herds on their seasonal rounds. Undomesticated herds were chosen to become more controllable for the proto-pastoralist nomadic hunter and gatherer groups by taming and domesticating them. Hunter-gatherers' strategies in the past have been very diverse and contingent upon the local environmental conditions, like those of mixed farmers. Foraging strategies have included hunting or trapping big game and smaller animals, fishing, collecting shellfish or insects, and gathering wild-plant foods such as fruits, seeds, and nuts. These diverse strategies for survival amongst the migratory herds could also provide an evolutionary route towards nomadic pastoralism.

== Resources ==
Pastoralism occurs in uncultivated areas. Wild animals eat the forage from the marginal lands and humans survive from milk, blood, and often meat of the herds and often trade by-products like wool and milk for money and food.

Pastoralists do not exist at basic subsistence. Pastoralists often compile wealth and participate in international trade. Pastoralists have trade relations with agriculturalists, horticulturalists, and other groups. Pastoralists are not extensively dependent on milk, blood, and meat of their herd. McCabe noted that when common property institutions are created, in long-lived communities, resource sustainability is much higher, which is evident in the East African grasslands of pastoralist populations. However, the property rights structure is only one of the many different parameters that affect the sustainability of resources, and common or private property per se, does not necessarily lead to sustainability.

Some pastoralists supplement herding with hunting and gathering, fishing and/or small-scale farming or pastoral farming. Pastoralist communities are noted for their resilience but CAFOD's Christine Allen has commented that the coincidence of many crises in recent years, including climate change, the COVID-19 pandemic and recurring drought conditions has stretched the resilience of northern Kenya's pastoralist communities "beyond breaking point".

== Mobility ==
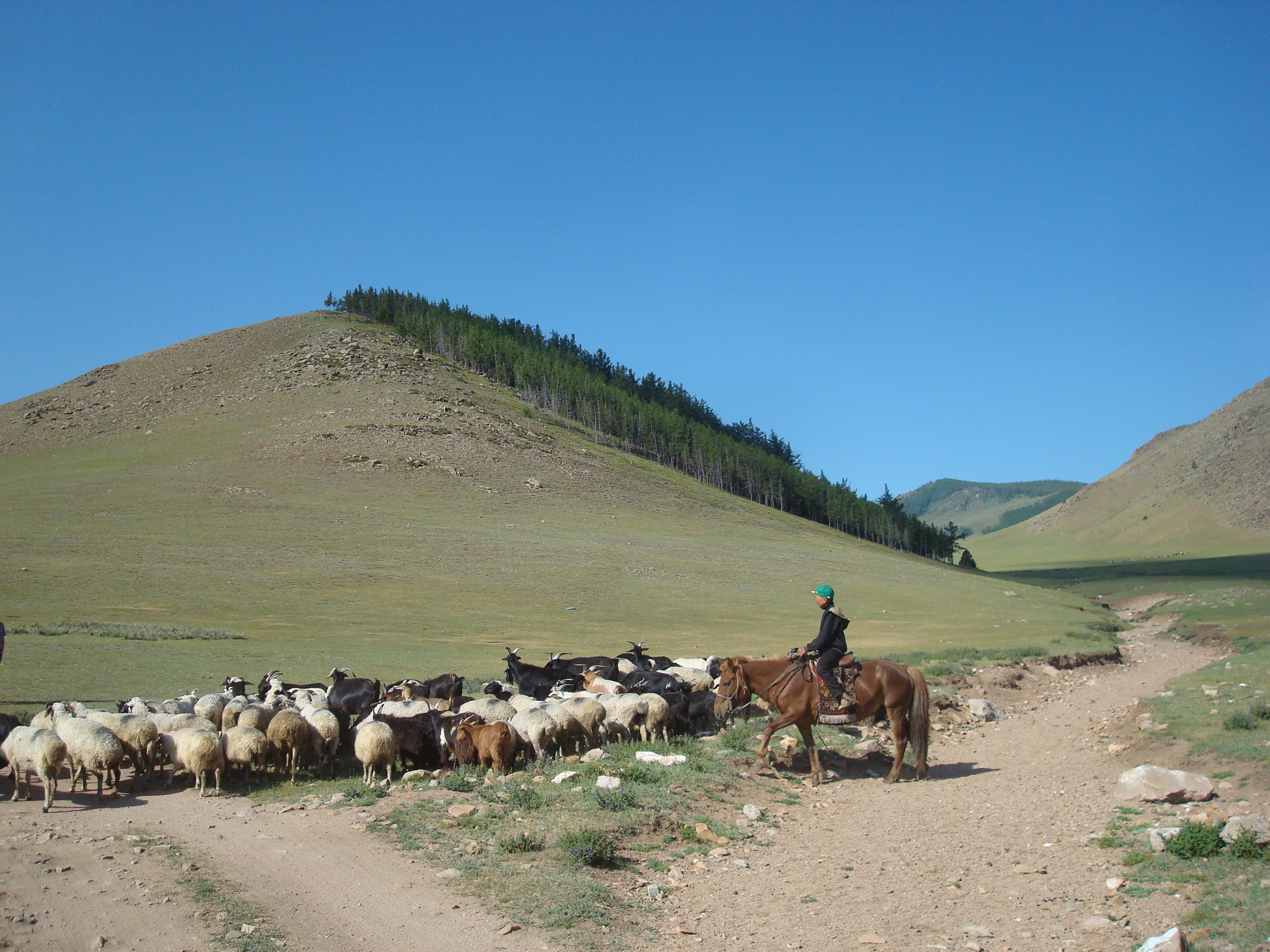
Mongol pastoralist in the Khövsgöl Province

Mobility allows pastoralists to adapt to the environment, which opens up the possibility for both fertile and infertile regions to support human existence. Important components of pastoralism include low population density, mobility, vitality, and intricate information systems. The system is transformed to fit the environment rather than adjusting the environment to support the "food production system". Mobile pastoralists can often cover a radius of a hundred to five hundred kilometers.

Pastoralists and their livestock have impacted the environment. Lands long used for pastoralism have transformed under the forces of grazing livestock and anthropogenic fire. Fire was a method of revitalizing pastureland and preventing forest regrowth. The collective environmental weights of fire and livestock browsing have transformed landscapes in many parts of the world. Fire has permitted pastoralists to tend the land for their livestock. Political boundaries are based on environmental boundaries. The Maquis shrublands of the Mediterranean region are dominated by pyrophytic plants that thrive under conditions of anthropogenic fire and livestock grazing.

Nomadic pastoralists have a global food-producing strategy depending on the management of herd animals for meat, skin, wool, milk, blood, manure, and transport. Nomadic pastoralism is practiced in different climates and environments with daily movement and seasonal migration. Pastoralists are among the most flexible populations. Pastoralist societies have had field armed men protect their livestock and their people and then to return into a disorganized pattern of foraging. The products of the herd animals are the most important resources, although the use of other resources, including domesticated and wild plants, hunted animals, and goods accessible in a market economy are not excluded. The boundaries between states impact the viability of subsistence and trade relations with cultivators.

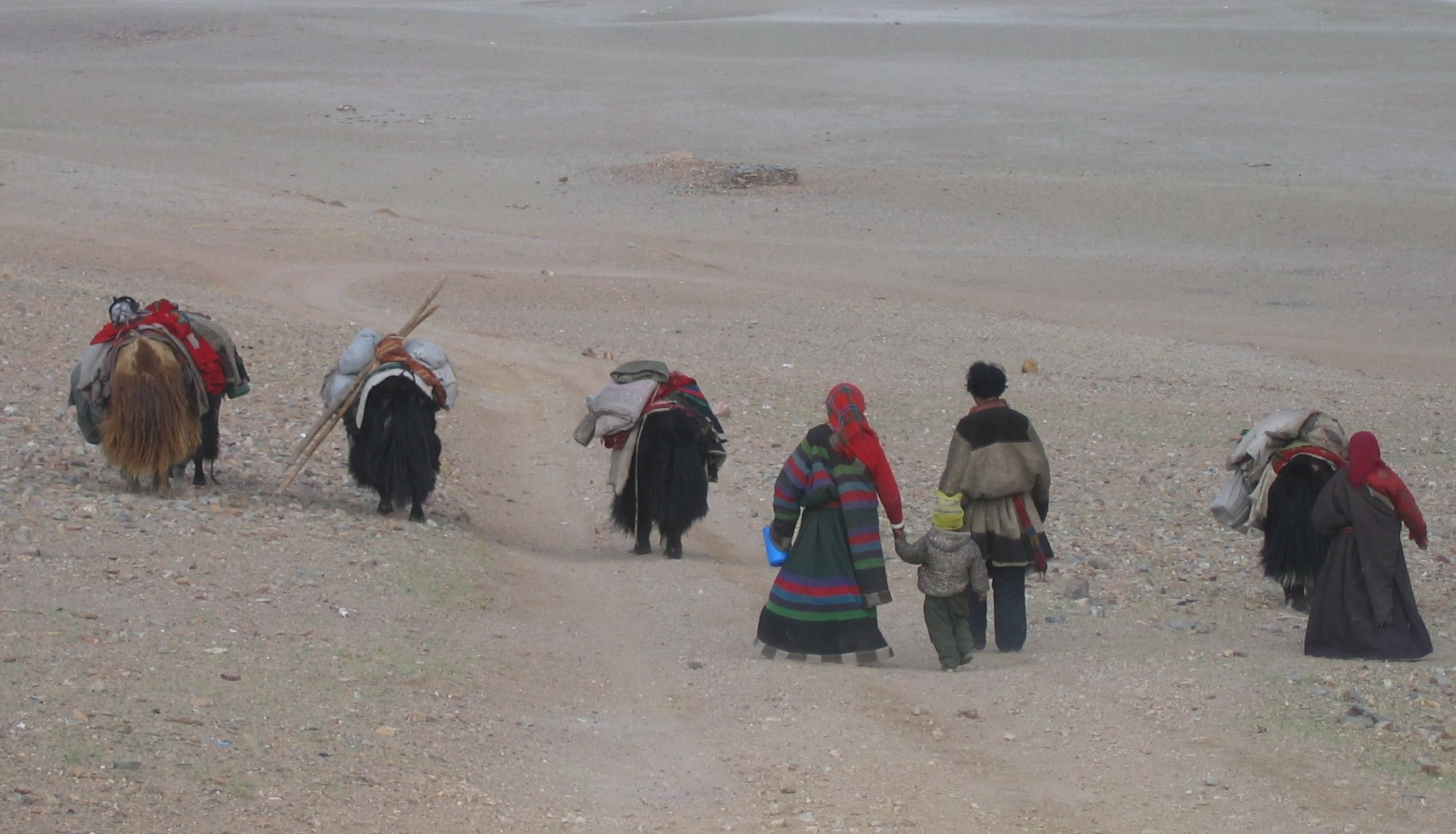
Changpa nomadic family on the Tibetan Plateau

Pastoralist strategies typify effective adaptation to the environment. Precipitation differences are evaluated by pastoralists. In East Africa, different animals are taken to specific regions throughout the year that corresponds to the seasonal patterns of precipitation. Transhumance is the migration of livestock and pastoralists between seasonal pastures.

In the Himalayas, pastoralists have often historically and traditionally depended on rangelands lying across international borders. The Himalayas contain several international borders, such as those between India and China, India and Nepal, Bhutan and China, India and Pakistan, and Pakistan and China. With the growth of nation states in Asia since the mid-twentieth century, mobility across the international borders in these countries have tended to be more and more restricted and regulated. As a consequence, the old, customary arrangements of trans-border pastoralism have generally tended to disintegrate, and trans-border pastoralism has declined. Within these countries, pastoralism is often at conflict these days with new modes of community forestry, such as Van Panchayats (Uttarakhand) and Community Forest User Groups (Nepal), which tend to benefit settled agricultural communities more. Frictions have also tended to arise between pastoralists and development projects such as dam-building and the creation of protected areas.

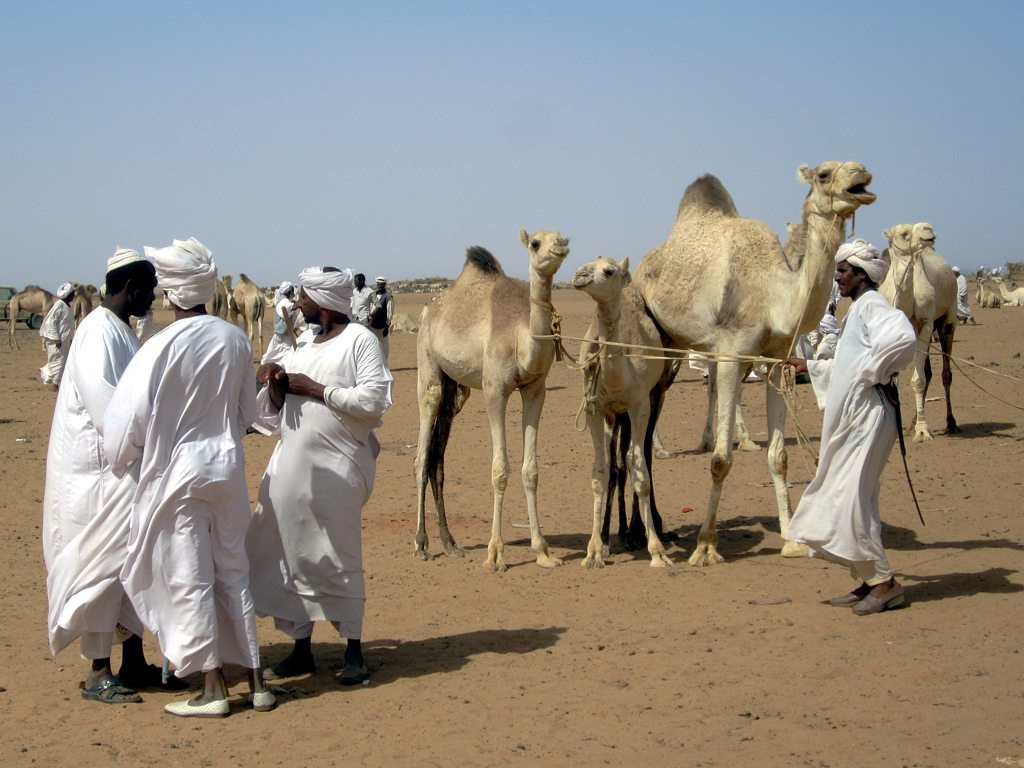
Camel market in Sudan

Some pastoralists are constantly moving, which may put them at odds with sedentary people of towns and cities. The resulting conflicts can result in war for disputed lands. These disputes are recorded in ancient times in the Middle East, as well as for East Asia. Other pastoralists are able to remain in the same location which results in longer-standing housing.

Different mobility patterns can be observed: Somali pastoralists keep their animals in one of the harshest environments but they have evolved over the centuries. Somalis have well-developed pastoral culture where complete system of life and governance has been refined. Somali poetry depicts humans interactions, pastoral animals, beasts on the prowl, and other natural things such the rain, celestial events and historic events of significance. Wise sage Guled Haji coined a proverb that encapsulates the centrality of water in pastoral life:

Ceel biyo lihi ma foga

— Guled Haji
Translation:

A well which has water is never far

Mobility was an important strategy for the Ariaal; however with the loss of grazing land impacted by the growth in population, severe drought, the expansion of agriculture, and the expansion of commercial ranches and game parks, mobility was lost. The poorest families were driven out of pastoralism and into towns to take jobs. Few Ariaal families benefited from education, healthcare, and income earning.

The flexibility of pastoralists to respond to environmental change was reduced by colonization. For example, mobility was limited in the Sahel region of Africa with settlement being encouraged. The population tripled and sanitation and medical treatment were improved.

== Environment knowledge ==
Pastoralists have mental maps of the value of specific environments at different times of year. Pastoralists have an understanding of ecological processes and the environment. Information sharing is vital for creating knowledge through the networks of linked societies.

Pastoralists produce food in the world's harshest environments, and pastoral production supports the livelihoods of rural populations on almost half of the world's land. Several hundred million people are pastoralists, mostly in Africa and Asia. ReliefWeb reported that "Several hundred million people practice pastoralism—the use of extensive grazing on rangelands for livestock production, in over 100 countries worldwide. The African Union estimated that Africa has about 268 million pastoralists—over a quarter of the total population—living on about 43 percent of the continent's total land mass." Pastoralists manage rangelands covering about a third of the Earth's terrestrial surface and are able to produce food where crop production is not possible.

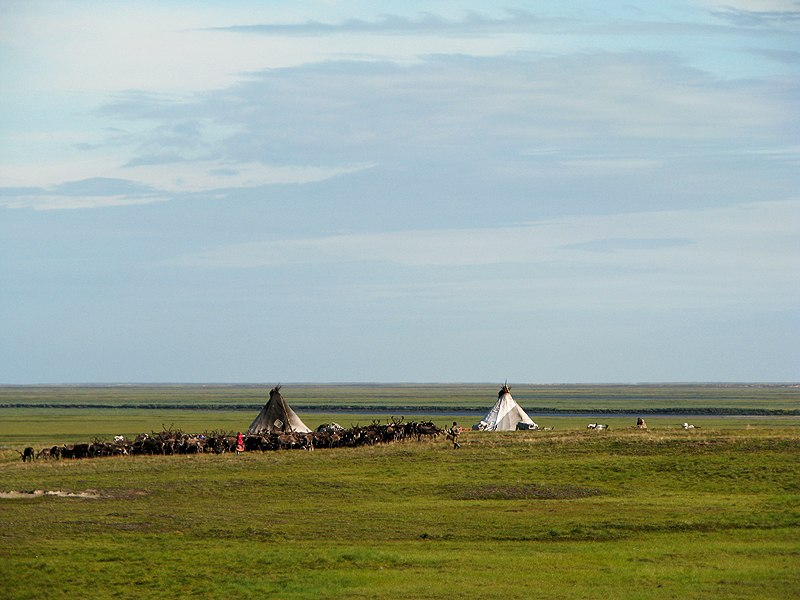
Nenets reindeer herders in Russia

Pastoralism has been shown, "based on a review of many studies, to be between 2 and 10 times more productive per unit of land than the capital intensive alternatives that have been put forward". However, many of these benefits go unmeasured and are frequently squandered by policies and investments that seek to replace pastoralism with more capital intensive modes of production. They have traditionally suffered from poor understanding, marginalization and exclusion from dialogue. The Pastoralist Knowledge Hub, managed by the Food and Agriculture Organization of the UN serves as a knowledge repository on technical excellence on pastoralism as well as "a neutral forum for exchange and alliance building among pastoralists and stakeholders working on pastoralist issues".

The Afar people in Ethiopia use an indigenous communication method called dagu for information. This helps them in getting crucial information about climate and availability of pastures at various locations.

== Farm animal genetic resource ==
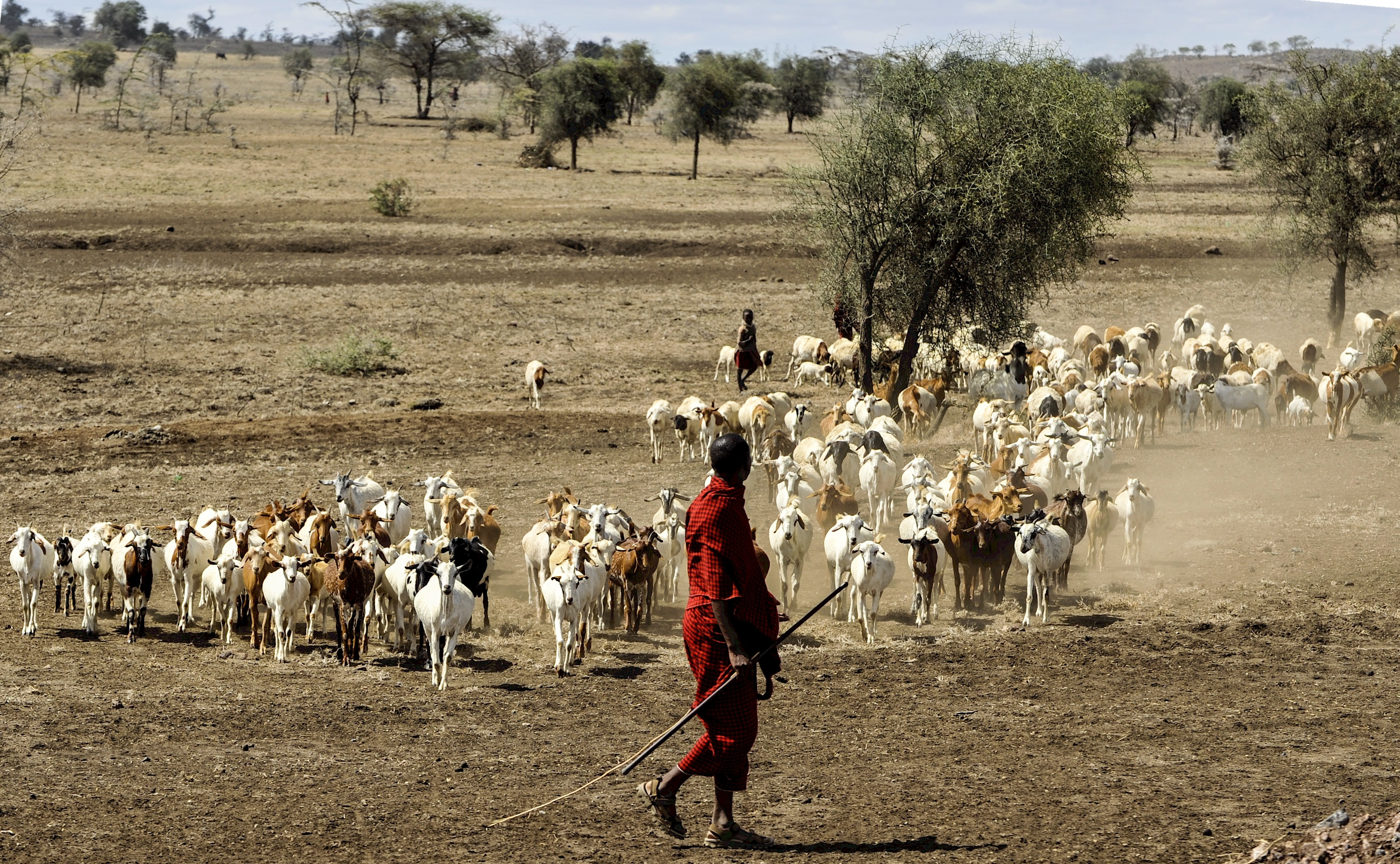
Maasai herder with his livestock in Kenya

There is a variation in genetic makeup of the farm animals driven mainly by natural and human based selection. For example, pastoralists in large parts of Sub Saharan Africa are preferring livestock breeds which are adapted to their environment and able to tolerate drought and diseases. However, in other animal production systems these breeds are discouraged and more productive exotic ones are favored. This situation could not be left unaddressed due to the changes in market preferences and climate all over the world, which could lead to changes in livestock diseases occurrence and decline forage quality and availability. Hence pastoralists can maintain farm animal genetic resources by conserving local livestock breeds. Generally conserving farm animal genetic resources under pastoralism is advantageous in terms of reliability and associated cost.

== Tragedy of the commons ==
Garrett Hardin's Tragedy of the Commons (1968) described how common property resources, such as the land shared by pastoralists, eventually become overused and ruined. According to Hardin's paper, the pastoralist land use strategy was unstable and a cause of environmental degradation.

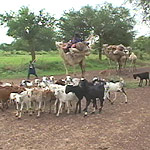
Tuareg pastoralists and their herds flee south into Nigeria from Niger during the 2005–06 Niger food crisis

One of Hardin's conditions for a "tragedy of the commons" is that people cannot communicate with each other or make agreements and contracts. Many scholars have pointed out that this is implausible, and yet it is applied in development projects around the globe, motivating the destruction of community and other governance systems that have managed sustainable pastoral systems for thousands of years. The outcomes have often been disastrous. In her book Governing the Commons, Elinor Ostrom showed that communities were not trapped and helpless amid diminishing commons. She argued that a common-pool resource, such as grazing lands used for pastoralism, can be managed more sustainably through community groups and cooperatives than through privatization or total governmental control. Ostrom was awarded a Nobel Memorial Prize in Economic Sciences for her work.

Pastoralists in the Sahel zone in Africa were held responsible for the depletion of resources. The depletion of resources was actually triggered by a prior interference and punitive climate conditions. Hardin's paper suggested a solution to the problems, offering a coherent basis for privatization of land, which stimulates the transfer of land from tribal peoples to the state or to individuals. The privatized programs impact the livelihood of the pastoralist societies while weakening the environment. Settlement programs often serve the needs of the state in reducing the autonomy and livelihoods of pastoral people.

The violent herder–farmer conflicts in Nigeria, Mali, Sudan, Ethiopia and other countries in the Sahel and Horn of Africa regions have been exacerbated by climate change, land degradation, and population growth.

It has also been shown that pastoralism supports human existence in harsh environments and often represents a sustainable approach to land use.

== See also ==
- Animal Genetic Resources for Food and Agriculture
- Herding
- Holistic management
- Pastoral society
- Pastoral (or bucolic) – related genre of literature, art, and music

== Bibliography ==
- Fagan, B. (1999). "Drought Follows the Plow", adapted from Floods, Famines and Emperors: Basic Books.
- Fratkin, E. (1997). "Pastoralism: Governance & Development Issues". Annual Review of Anthropology, 26: 235–261.
- Hardin, G. (1968). "The Tragedy of the Commons". Science, 162(3859), 1243–1248.
- Angioni, Giulio (1989). I pascoli erranti. Antropologia del pastore in Sardegna. Napoli, Liguori. ISBN 978-8820718619.
- Hole, F. (1996). "The context of caprine domestication in the Zagros region'". in The Origins and Spread of Agriculture and Pastoralism in Eurasia. D.R. Harris (ed.). London, University College of London: 263–281.
- Lees, S & Bates, D. (1974). "The Origins of Specialized Nomadic Pastoralism: A Systematic Model". American Antiquity, 39, 2.
- Levy, T.E. (1983). "Emergence of specialized pastoralism in the Levant". World Archaeology 15(1): 15–37.
- Moran, E. (2006). People and Nature: An Introduction to Human Ecological Relations. UK: Blackwell Publishing.
- Pyne, Stephen J. (1997). Vestal Fire: An Environmental History, Told through Fire, of Europe and Europe's Encounter with the World. Seattle and London: University of Washington Press. ISBN 0-295-97596-2.
- Townsend, P. (2009). Environmental Anthropology: From Pigs to Policies. United States of America: Waveland Press.
- Wilson, K.B. (1992). "Re-Thinking the Pastoral Ecological Impact in East Africa". Global Ecology and Biogeography Letters, 2(4): 143–144.
- Toutain B., Marty A., Bourgeot A. Ickowicz A. & Lhoste P. (2012). Pastoralism in dryland areas. A case study in sub-Saharan Africa. Les dossiers thématiques du CSFD. N°9. January 2013. CSFD/Agropolis International, Montpellier, France. 60 p.
