= Ariaal people =

The Ariaal are northern Kenyan pastoralists. They claim descent from cattle-owning Samburu who captured significant herds of camels and learned how to manage them from their eastern neighbours, the Rendille. This led them to adopt the Rendille culture, language, and other Rendille practices, such as monogamy. Before Kenya independence, the separation between the cattle and camel economies was vividly reflected in the division between an Ariaal elder's senior wife, whose family would be reared as Ariaal, and his junior wives who lived with his cattle as Samburu. In effect, such elders continued to straddle the boundary between monogamous camel-owning Ariaal and polygynous cattle-owning Samburu, speaking both languages and participating in both cultures.

An Ariaal person killing a lion is highly respected.

== Ethnological studies ==
They have been the subject of much study by anthropologists, especially Elliot Fratkin. More recent work has been conducted by Bettina Shell-Duncan, Benjamin Campbell and their respective students.

== Genetics and behavior ==
An article in The New York Times (Nov. 2, 2014) reports on research for which the evolution of the societal patterns of the Ariaal people into two subgroups (nomadic herders vs. settled growers) seems to provide a rather unusual intersection for the study of genetics and behavior. The researcher, Dan T. A. Eisenberg, a University of Washington anthropologist, is reported to be studying genetic variation of a Dopamine type 4 receptor (DRD4 7R) and finding correlated differences between the genetic variation and the chosen lifestyle of a given Ariaal subgroup. Eisenberg's research builds on a growing number of studies connecting the status of an individual's dopamine receptors and an ADHD diagnosis, and is presented in this article in the context of the proliferation of ADHD diagnoses in Western society, as one key new body of research exploring whether ADHD is more functional than is recognized, a distinctive but functional (i.e., not pathological) phenomenon that has significant evolutionary roots in terms of having predisposed survival at a time when a hunter's instinct was aided by a certain restlessness. The research into the Ariaal subgroup differences seems to have suggestive implications supportive of a nonpathologizing view that what "ADHD" signifies is an individual's suitedness to a different kind of environment (and degree and type of activity) than the one the individual finds him/herself in.
