= Hyperfocus =

Intense form of mental concentration

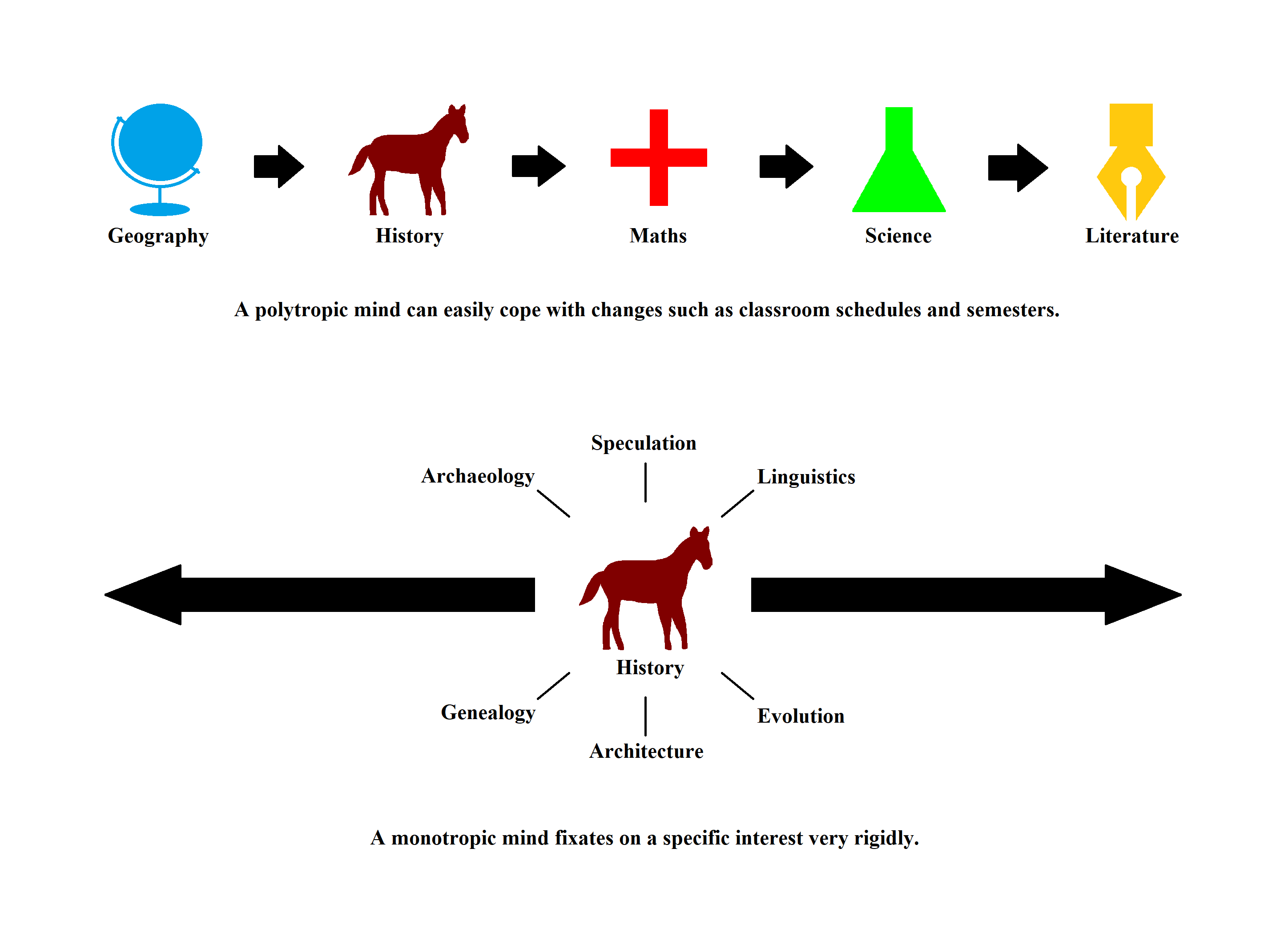
Monotropic (hyperfocus) and polytropic learning

Hyperfocus is an intense form of mental concentration or visualization that focuses consciousness on a subject, topic, or task. In some individuals, such subjects or topics may also include daydreams, concepts, fiction, the imagination, and other objects of the mind. Hyperfocus on a certain subject can cause side-tracking away from assigned or important tasks.

Psychiatrically, it is considered to be a trait of attention deficit hyperactivity disorder (ADHD) together with inattention, and it has been proposed as a trait of other conditions, such as schizophrenia and autism spectrum disorder (ASD).

One proposed factor in hyperfocus as a symptom involves the psychological theory of brain lateralization, wherein one hemisphere of the brain specializes in some neural functions and cognitive processes over others. Those who have a tendency to hyperfocus, such as those with ADHD, may experience a form of "pseudoneglect", where attention is dominant on one side of the brain, leading to preferential attention in some neural connections and processes over others overall. While this idea is under study, it is not yet empirically proven.

Hyperfocus may bear a relationship to the concept of flow. In some circumstances, both flow and hyperfocus can be an aid to achievement, but in other circumstances, the same focus and behavior could be a liability, distracting from the task at hand. However, unlike hyperfocus, "flow" is often described in more positive terms, suggesting they are not two sides of the same condition under contrasting circumstance or intellect.

== Psychiatric symptom ==
Hyperfocus may in some cases also be symptomatic of a psychiatric condition. In some cases, it is referred to as perseveration—an inability or impairment in switching tasks or activities ("set-shifting"), or desisting from mental or physical response repetition (gestures, words, thoughts) despite absence or cessation of a stimulus. It is distinguished from stereotypy (a highly repetitive idiosyncratic behaviour).

Conditions associated with hyperfocus or perseveration include neurodevelopmental disorders, particularly those with autism spectrum disorder and attention deficit hyperactivity disorder (ADHD). In ADHD, it may be a coping mechanism or a symptom of emotional self-regulation. So called "twice exceptional" people, with high intellect and learning disabilities, may have either or both of hyperfocus and perseverative behaviours. They are often mimicked by similar conditions involving executive dysfunction or emotional dysregulation, and lack of diagnosis and treatment may lead to further co-morbidity.

=== ADHD ===
In ADHD, formulation and thinking can be slower than in people not affected by the disorder (though this is not universal), and may be "long-winded or tangential". These inattentive symptoms occur dually with what has been termed "hyperfocus" by the 2019 Updated European Consensus Statement on Adult ADHD. The over-concentration or hyperfocus often occurs if the person finds something "very interesting and/or provide(s) instant gratification, such as computer games or online chatting. For such activities, concentration may last for hours on end, in a very focused manner."

ADHD is a difficulty in directing one's attention (an executive function of the frontal lobe), not a lack of attention.

Conditions likely to be confused with hyperfocus often involve repetition of thoughts or behaviors such as obsessive–compulsive disorder, trauma, and some cases of traumatic brain injury.

=== Autism ===
Two major symptoms of autism spectrum disorder (ASD) include repetitive sounds or movements and fixation on various things including topics and activities. Hyperfocus in the context of ASD has also been referred to as the inability to redirect thoughts or tasks as the situation changes (cognitive flexibility).

One suggested explanation for hyperfocus in those with ASD is that the activity they are hyperfocused on is predictable. Aversion to unpredictable situations is a characteristic of ASD, while focusing on something predictable, they will have trouble changing to a task that is unpredictable.

=== Schizophrenia ===
Schizophrenia is a mental condition characterized by a disconnect from reality, including grandiose delusions, disorganized thinking, and abnormal social behavior. Recently, hyperfocus has come into attention as a part of the cognitive symptoms associated with the disorder. In this use, hyperfocus is an intense focus on processing the information in front of them. This hypothesis suggests that hyperfocus is the reason those afflicted with schizophrenia experience difficulty spreading their attention across multiple things.

=== Psychopathy ===
Some research, such as that of Naomi Sadeh and Edelyn Verona, published in Neuropsychology in 2008, has suggested that psychopaths are hyperfocused on obtaining a reward and, as a result, their ability to use contextual cues, punishment, or contextual information for adjusting their behaviour may be impaired. Moreover, they may develop tunnel vision blocking out any peripheral stimulation (such as fear of achieving the goal).

== See also ==
- Absent-mindedness
- Hunter vs. farmer hypothesis
- Mind-wandering (antonym)
- Procedural knowledge
