= Perseveration =

Repetition of some action despite the cessation of stimulus

Perseveration, in the fields of psychology, psychiatry, and speech–language pathology, is the repetition of a particular response (such as a word, phrase, or gesture) regardless of the absence or cessation of a stimulus. It is usually caused by a brain injury or other organic disorder. Symptoms include "lacking ability to transition or switch ideas appropriately with the social context, as evidenced by the repetition of words or gestures after they have ceased to be socially relevant or appropriate", or the "act or task of doing so", and are not better described as stereotypy (a highly repetitive idiosyncratic behaviour).

In a broader sense, it is used for a wide range of functionless behaviours that arise from a failure of the brain to either inhibit prepotent responses or to allow its usual progress to a different behavior, and includes impairment in set shifting and task switching in social and other contexts.

The primary definition of perseveration in biology and clinical psychiatry involves some form of response repetition or the inability to undertake set shifting (changing of goals, tasks or activities) as required, and is usually evidenced by behaviours such as words and gestures continuing to be repeated despite absence or cessation of a stimulus.

More broadly in clinical psychology, it describes mental or physical behaviours which are not excessive in terms of quantity but are apparently both functionless and involve a narrow range of behaviours.

Etymologically, the term derives from "persevere", meaning "to continue determinedly", from Latin "perseverare", meaning "to persist": persistent behaviour directed toward an identifiable goal is called "perseverance", but when not directed toward such a goal is called "perseveration". In general English, "perseveration" refers to insistent or redundant repetition, not necessarily in a clinical context.

== Associated conditions and manifestations ==
Perseveration of thought indicates an inability to switch ideas or responses. An example of perseveration is, during a conversation, if an issue has been fully explored and discussed to a point of resolution, it is not uncommon for something to trigger the reinvestigation of the matter. This can happen at any time during a conversation.

Physical brain injury, trauma or damage

- Perseveration is particularly common with those who have had traumatic brain injury.
- Perseveration is sometimes a feature of frontal lobe lesions, and of other conditions involving dysfunction or dysregulation within the frontal lobe. This is especially true when the lateral orbitofrontal cortex or inferior prefrontal convexity (Brodmann areas 47/12) are affected.
- Perseveration is also sometimes seen as a symptom of aphasia.

Other neurological conditions

- Perseveration is a common feature of frontal lobe syndrome, as well as neurodegenerative diseases such as progressive supranuclear palsy, corticobasal syndrome and chronic acetogenin poisoning.
- Perseveration may also refer to the obsessive and highly selective interests of individuals on the autism spectrum.
- In attention deficit hyperactivity disorder (ADHD), perseveration or "hyperfocus" commonly occurs as an impairment of set shifting and task switching.
- In people who are both intellectually gifted and have a learning disability, the state of hyperfocus and flow can be confounded with perseveration.
- Apart from their direct symptoms, people with obsessive–compulsive disorder can have specific problems with set shifting and inhibition of prepotent responses.

Confounds (conditions with similar appearing symptoms)

- Perseveration may be confused with habitual behaviours in a number of other conditions and disorders, such as obsessive–compulsive disorder, including post-traumatic stress disorder (PTSD), body dysmorphic disorder, trichotillomania, and habit problems. However, in animal experiments, it is possible to distinguish cognitive perseveration from repetition due to a motor disorder. For example, under low doses of amphetamine an animal will perseverate in maintaining an arbitrary object preference even when different motor responses are required to maintain that preference.

Unproven:

- Several researchers have tried to connect perseveration with a lack of memory inhibition (the idea that the person might be repeating a certain answer because they have not been able to forget a past question and move on to the current subject); however, this connection could not be found, or was small.
