= Jonathan Leo =

American anatomy professor

- Education: Macalester College; University of Iowa
- Scientific career
- Fields: Neuroanatomy
- Institutions: Kansas City University
- Thesis: Alcohol-induced neuropathology in the neonatal rat brain (1995)
- Doctoral advisor: Nicholas Pantazis

Jonathan T. Leo is a former Professor of Anatomy at Lincoln Memorial University in Harrogate, Tennessee and former Associate Professor of Anatomy at the Alabama College of Osteopathic Medicine. He is currently the Chair of Pathology and Anatomical Sciences and a Professor of Anatomy at the Kansas City University College of Osteopathic Medicine. He has published articles critical of chemical and biological theories of mental illness. He is the former editor-in-chief of Ethical Human Psychology and Psychiatry. With Sami Timimi, he is also the co-editor of the book Rethinking ADHD.

== JAMA controversy ==
In 2008, Leo and Jeffrey Lacasse co-authored a letter to the editor that was published in JAMA. The letter criticized a randomized controlled trial that had been published in JAMA aimed at determining the effectiveness of the antidepressant drug escitalopram in the treatment of stroke. Leo and Lacasse criticized the original trial for not directly comparing the effectiveness of escitalopram with that of problem-solving therapy. After this letter was published, Leo discovered through a Google search that one of the authors of the escitalopram paper, psychiatrist Robert Robinson, had received speaking fees from Forest Laboratories, the company that produces and sells the drug under the name Lexapro. Robinson had not disclosed this conflict of interest in the paper. Five months later, Leo and Lacasse published a letter on the website of the BMJ pointing out this conflict of interest.
