= Epidemiology of attention deficit hyperactive disorder =

Attention deficit hyperactivity disorder (ADHD) is a neurodevelopmental disorder characterized by difficulty focusing attention, hyperactivity, and impulsive behavior. Treatments generally involve behavioral therapy and/or medications (stimulants and non-stimulants).

== Global ==
On a global scale, about 2-5% of adults have ADHD. Among children, the percentage is higher at 8%. Between girls and boys of this percentage, approximately 10% of boys and 5% of girls had ADHD. The three types of ADHD are: inattentive (ADHD-I), hyperactive (ADHD-HI), and combination (ADHD-C). Of the types, the most common was inattentive followed by hyperactive and then finally combination. While overall percentages of ADHD remain similar, each country has slightly different treatment, social norms, and understanding of the disorder that impact its diagnosis.

== Africa ==
=== Nigeria ===
Studies done within Nigeria have estimated the prevalence rates of ADHD to be 7.6% for the entire population. Previous studies done from 2006-2014 showed 6.9% of the population with ADHD. This increase in diagnostic could be linked to better recognition and understanding of the disorder within Nigerian communities. However, negative stigmas within social norms still impact this percentage. The fear of judgement and a lack of understanding of what the disorder is leads to delayed professional consultations and misinterpretation of symptoms someone may be experiencing.

=== South Africa ===
The number of adults between the ages of 20-50 with ADHD was estimated to be about 1.09%. However, within clinical psychiatric settings, the number of patients with ADHD was 52.5%, a large difference. A possible determined cause for this is lack of knowledge and funding to research about the disorder may be the reason the number of patents with ADHD was so high. Furthermore, these individuals could have been misdiagnosed as ADHD symptoms in adults are similar to 20.43% of other psychiatric conditions; the similarities paired with adequate knowledge to tell different conditions apart, may have played a part in this.

== Asia ==
=== China ===
In the age group 6-16, the percentage of ADHD diagnosed is about 6.4% within China. It is typically diagnosed within childhood and continues to manifest in adulthood. In a study about the prevalence of ADHD within Shanghai, China, the amount of caregivers reporting their patients to have ADHD was twice the actual prevalence of ADHD. Causes for this can be linked to lack of knowledge, as care-givers are not professionals and may be unaware of the specifics in diagnosing ADHD. This could also be due to higher screening rated for ADHD which in turn, result in more ADHD diagnosis.

=== India ===
The general percentage of people with ADHD in India ranges between 2-17%. Within the adult population of India, study has shown that 5.48-25.7% have ADHD. In the age range of 6-11, approximately 5.76% prevalence rate was reported. Of that 5.76%, 3.8% was determined to be girls and 1.9% was determined to be boys. The high presence of ADHD among adults in India shows the importance for further research since so many adults have it, much higher compared to other countries.

== Oceania ==
=== Australia ===
The Australian Institute of Health and Welfare reports that the most recent national data on childhood and adolescent mental health (gathered in 2013–14) demonstrated that the prevalence of ADHD was 8.2% in children aged 4–11 and 6.3% in adolescents aged 12–17. Severe disorders were more common among boys (10.9%) than girls (5.4%). In comparison to girls aged 4–11 years, the prevalence of ADHD was lower in girls aged 12–17 years (2.7% vs. 5.4%), although it was roughly the same in males (9.8% vs. 10.9%).

=== New Zealand ===
New Zealand has an estimated population of ADHD impacted individuals of 5.38%. Of this percentage, a majority are children as adults are still underdiagnosed due to social stigma and lack of awareness. ADHD assessment in New Zealand consists of seeing your general practitioner and requesting an ADHD test. These assessments are often expensive which is why private health insurances tend to cover them.

== Europe ==
=== Germany ===
ADHD is among the most common mental disorders diagnosed within Germany. Research on ADHD within Germany was relatively limited until new studies as of the past 5 years have improved understanding and treatment methods. Within children, 0-19, 4.1% have ADHD while this is 3% for adults. Recent research on ADHD has improved treatment and utilization of treatment as now over 40% of children and adolescents within Germany reported receiving treatment for it and of that 40%, 85% of the parents saw the treatment as effective.

=== France ===
Until recently, the prevalence of ADHD within children had never been studied within France. A Study from March 2025 found that among children and adolescent's in France with ADHD range from about 3.5-5.6% of the population. Of these diagnosed, men were more prevalently diagnosed than women which could be in part due to the way symptoms tend to appear based on biological sex. In France, researchers found that compared to neurotypical children, children with ADHD were at a higher risk of having Oppositional Defiant Disorder (ODD) and Conduct Disorder (CD).

== North America ==
=== United States ===
In the United States it is diagnosed in roughly 7 million children aged 3–17, with boys being 15% more likely to be diagnosed than girls at 8%. The prevalence of ADHD within the age group of 5–11 years for both male and female children is 8.6%, whereas children in the age group of 12–17 years is 14.3%. Boys outnumber girls across all three subtyping categories, but the exact magnitude of these differences seems to depend on both the informant (parent, teacher, etc.) and the subtype.

=== Mexico ===
Mexico has a high percentage of ADHD, especially among children, compared to global percentages; 9.1-16% of children in Mexico have ADHD. A study done on college undergraduate in Mexico showed that overall 16.2% tested positive for ADHD. However, this was different between woman and men as woman had 22.14% and men had 13%. The significantly higher percentage of ADHD individuals in Mexico warrants extra research to determine why the number is so high. However, something that may impact the accuracy of this percentage is the accuracy of the ASRS-6 and WURS scaled they used to measure the ADHD symptoms.

== South America ==
=== Brazil ===
In Brazil ADHD prevalence is currently determined to be 4.59%. In Brazil, it was found that among diagnosed individuals with ADHD, they tended to be younger and overall had higher rates of unemployment compared to non-ADHD individuals. Of all age groups, the ones with the highest rated were children ages 5 to 9 and boys were diagnosed overwhelmingly more than girls. When analyzing regional distributions of ADHD, it was found that it has a higher prevalence in the Northeast and a lower one in the North of Brazil.

=== Colombia ===
Colombia studies on ADHD have shown significantly higher percentage in children compared to the global average. Within children, ADHD prevalence is between 11-20% and among adults it's 4.4%. For the 3 main types of ADHD the prevalence was 9.4% for combined, 6.7% for inattentive, and 1% for impulsive. Boys had way higher percentages as it was 21.8% in boys and only 10.9% in girls. The significant amount of individuals, children mainly, within Colombia encourages new research on ADHD specifically in that area. Researchers are trying to find the cause of such high prevalence rates within Colombia.
