= Sami Timimi =

British psychiatrist

Sami Timimi is a British psychiatrist, psychotherapist, and author. He works as a consultant in child and adolescent psychiatry. He writes from a critical psychiatry perspective on topics relating to mental health and childhood and has published extensively in medical, educational, and sociological journals.

== Early life and education ==
Sami Timimi grew up primarily in Iraq until the age of 14, then due to political difficulties moved to the United Kingdom; his mother is British-English and his father Iraqi. He has written of his experience of psychiatric training and early practice.

== Career ==
Timimi is sceptical of the benefits of psychiatric diagnosis, seen as primarily cultural constructions, and has critiqued the medicalisation of the various problems subsumed under the categories of ADHD and autism. He has described global mental health initiatives as a form of neo-liberalism.

In his own practice he uses group psychotherapy focused on building relationships, using some techniques from the Nurtured Heart Approach. This therapeutic methodology, pioneered by Howard Glassner in 1992, is, according to the Nurtured Heart Institute, "based on the premise that an individual's intense energy can be positively channelled and transformed into a positive force".

Timimi has authored several books, including A Straight-Talking Introduction to Children's Mental Health Problems, published in 2009

His 2025 book Searching for Normal: A New Approach to Understanding Mental Health, Distress and Neurodiversity has received much acclaim.

== Recognition ==
Timimi gained an NHS England Regional Innovation Fund award for leading on an Outcome Orientated Child and Adolescent Mental Health Services (OO-CAMHS) project.

== Other activities ==
As of 2016 Timimi was a member of the Council for Evidence Based Psychiatry, which focuses on adverse effects of medications in the long-term.

In 2020, Timimi helped organise an open letter to Adrian James, the new president of the Royal College of Psychiatrists, calling on British psychiatry to do more to tackle racism.

== Books ==
- Timimi, Sami (2025). Searching for Normal: A New Approach to Understanding Mental Health, Distress and Neurodiversity. London: Fern Press / Penguin. ISBN 9781911717133.
- Timimi, Sami (2021). A Straight Talking Introduction to Children's Mental Health Problems (2nd ed.). Ross-on-Wye: PCCS Books. ISBN 9781910919835.
- Timimi, Sami (2020). Insane Medicine: How the Mental Health Industry Creates Damaging Treatment Traps and How You Can Escape Them. KDP Publishing. ISBN 9798566925608.
- Runswick-Cole, K., Mallet, R., Timimi, S. (eds.) (2016) Re-thinking Autism: Diagnosis, Identity, and Equality. London: Jessica-Kingsley
- Timimi, S., Tetley, D., Burgoine, W. (2012) Outcome Orientated Child and Adolescent Mental Health Services (OO-CAMHS): A Service Transformation Toolkit. Author House UK.
- Timimi S, Gardiner N, McCabe, B. (2010) The Myth of Autism: Medicalising Men's and Boys' Social and Emotional Competence. Basingstoke: Palgrave MacMillan.
- Timimi S (2009) A straight Talking Introduction to Children's Mental Health Problems. Ross-on-Wye: PCCS Books.
- Timimi, S. and Leo, J. (eds.) (2009) Rethinking ADHD: From Brain to Culture. Basingstoke: Palgrave MacMillan.
- Cohen, C. and Timimi, S. (eds.) (2008) Liberatory Psychiatry: Philosophy, Politics and Mental Health. Cambridge: Cambridge University Press.
- Timimi S and Maitra B (eds.) (2006) Critical Voices in Child and Adolescent Mental Health. London: Free Association.
- Timimi, S. (2007) Mis-Understanding ADHD: The Complete Guide for Parents to Alternatives to Drugs. Bloomington: Authorhouse.
- Timimi S (2005) Naughty Boys: Anti-Social Behaviour, ADHD and the Role of Culture. Basingstoke: Palgrave Macmillan.
- Timimi S (2002) Pathological Child Psychiatry and the Medicalization of Childhood. Hove: Brunner-Routledge
