= Attention-Deficit/Hyperactivity Disorder Investigator Symptom Rating Scale =

Rating scale for evaluation of ADHD severity and improvement

The Attention-Deficit/Hyperactivity Disorder Investigator Symptom Rating Scale (AISRS) is a rating scale for evaluation of attention-deficit hyperactivity disorder (ADHD) severity and improvement. It is an 18-item clinician-administered scale.

== See also ==
- ADHD Rating Scale (ADHD-RS)
- Conners Comprehensive Behaviour Rating Scale (Conners CBRS)
- Diagnostic Interview for ADHD in Adults (DIVA)
