= ADHD Rating Scale =

Self-reported ADHD assessment

The ADHD Rating Scale (ADHD-RS) is a parent-report or teacher-report inventory created by George J. DuPaul, Thomas J. Power, Arthur D. Anastopoulos, and Robert Reid consisting of 18–90 questions regarding a child's behavior over the past 6 months. The ADHD Rating Scale is used to aid in the diagnosis of attention deficit hyperactivity disorder (ADHD) in children ranging from ages 5–17.

The ADHD-RS is currently in its fifth version in correlation with the DSM-5.

== Overview ==
The ADHD-RS, is an 18-question self-report assessment that takes about five minutes to complete. Each question measures the frequency of the behavior, in which the respondent is asked to indicate whether the behavior occurs "always or very often", "often", "somewhat", or "rarely or never". The questionnaire is intended to be filled out by parents and teachers of the child or adolescent. The first nine items ask questions about behavior related to inattention (e.g., "has difficulty organizing task and activities"). The second set of nine items ask questions about behavior related to symptoms of hyperactivity and impulsivity (e.g., "talks excessively"). The last question asks if the behaviors were present before age seven. Some examples of ADHD behaviors measured by the scale include difficulty focusing on tasks, trouble with organizing, inability to pay attention, squirming, fidgeting, impatience, difficulty waiting their turn, and frequently interrupting others. The ADHD Rating scale has impacted the world of clinical psychology by providing an accurate and valid measure that is able to identify the presence of ADHD in children. It is also helpful in identifying the subtype (predominantly Inattentive, predominantly Hyperactive-Impulsive, and Combined) of the disorder. The ADHD Rating Scale has a high sensitivity and specificity for diagnosis based on teacher reports and a low specificity and high sensitivity for diagnosis based on parental reports. Rating scales filled out by teachers, are the most commonly used assessment tools by clinicians to evaluate ADHD behavior in children and adolescents in a school setting. Because of the possibility of biased interpretations of a child's behavior on the teacher's part, clinicians do not use it as the sole assessment tool when diagnosing ADHD in children and adolescents.

== Development and history ==
Attention deficit hyperactivity disorder (ADHD) is one of the most prevalent neurological disorders found in children.

The ADHD-RS was originally created and published by George J. DuPaul, Thomas J. Power, Arthur D. Anastopoulos, and Robert Reid in 1998; it was developed to address the need for an effective evaluation for children and adolescents suspected of having ADHD. The diagnostic criteria were developed through a selection of items from general rating scales such as the Child Behavior Checklist. The list initially contained 14 items and grew to the 18 questions we have today.

The assessment largely serves the purpose of matching parent and teacher observations of ADHD symptoms to DSM-IV criteria of ADHD. It was developed in tandem with the Academic Performance Rating Scale (APRS) to be used as a complementary system of identification for potential behavioral disorders in the classroom. Class performance is still a diagnostic factor though evaluated through the more comprehensive DSM-5 criteria; as children with ADHD are likely to find issue in scholastic performance, personal conduct, and maintaining social relationships.

DSM-IV outlines three subtypes of ADHD: ADHD combined type, ADHD predominantly inattentive, and ADHD predominantly hyperactive-impulsive. The ADHD-RS separates domain scores of "Inattention" and "Hyperactivity-Impulsivity" which ultimately results in three scores for "Inattention," Hyperactivity-Impulsivity", and "Total". DSM-IV also organizes diagnostic criteria into two categories of Inattention and Hyperactivity-Impulsivity, each of which includes nine symptoms. The eighteen questions of the ADHD-RS were written to reflect each symptom of both categories.

With the release of DSM-5, the questionnaire was adjusted to be in line with the new criteria established.

== Questionnaire versions ==
The four versions ask age-appropriate questions about hyperactivity and inattention in specific settings.

Home
There are two home versions — Child (ages 5–10) and Adolescent (ages 11–17). These are intended to be completed at home by a parent or guardian. The questions are specific to situations and activities in the home setting.
School
There are two school versions — Child (ages 5–10) and Adolescent (ages 11–17). These are intended to be completed at school by a teacher. The questions are specific to situations and activities in the school setting, such as staying in one's seat or completing schoolwork.

== Reliability and validity ==
=== Reliability ===
Rubric for evaluating norms and reliability for the ADHD Rating Scale (Note: Table from Youngstrom et al., extending Hunsley & Mash, 2008.)
| Criterion | Rating (adequate, good, excellent, too good (Note: New construct or category.)) | Explanation with references |
|---|---|---|
| Norms | Adequate | |
| Internal consistency (Cronbach's alpha, split half, etc.) | Excellent | Alphas were > .90 for the School and Home versions. |
| Inter-rater reliability | Less than adequate | reliability between parents and teachers was =.41 |
| Test-retest reliability (stability) | Adequate | Total score =.85 over a 4-week period |
| Repeatability | Not published | No published studies formally checking repeatability |

=== Validity ===
Evaluation of validity and utility for the ADHD Rating Scale
| Criterion | Rating (adequate, good, excellent, too good) | Explanation with references |
|---|---|---|
| Content validity | Adequate | Covers DSM diagnostic symptoms for both hyperactivity and impulsivity subtypes and combined type. |
| Construct validity (e.g., predictive, concurrent, convergent, and discriminant validity) | Excellent | In the clinical setting the predictive validity for the combined subscale for parents and teachers were 60% and 65% accuracy, respectively. This indicates that the assessment has statistically significant accuracy at identifying the diagnosis. |
| Discriminative validity | Adequate | Statistically significant discrimination in mean rating between three groups of participants that identified as ADHD Combined, ADHD Inattentive and no ADHD. |
| Validity generalization | Good | Used as other-report from both teachers and parents; used in school settings as well as clinical setting; assessment was normed on a random sample of the population that included many different ethnic and demographic backgrounds. |
| Treatment sensitivity | Adequate | Can be used in order to access progression of ADHD symptoms throughout treatment. |
| Clinical utility | Good | Easily accessible through the purchase of the handbook that includes the assessment and scoring information with permission to photocopy, strong psychometrics. Completion and scoring are quick and easy. |

== Impact ==
The ADHD Rating Scale has provided a quick and easy assessment for clinicians to use in order to diagnose ADHD according to the DSM criteria. The creation of this assessment also provided a consistent way for clinicians to diagnose ADHD in children. This assessment is used in both clinical and school settings to measure the presence of ADHD as well as the subtype that may be present. The measure can also be used to measure the presence and continuation of symptoms throughout treatment. This assessment has also been used as the basis for studies covering a wide variety of topics related to ADHD.

While the ADHD Rating Scale is widely used to assess ADHD symptoms in children and adolescents, a systematic review by Peterson et al. (2024) highlights its variable diagnostic performance and emphasizes the need for its use alongside clinician judgment and multiple informant inputs.

== Use in other populations ==
=== ADHD Rating Scale-IV ===
The ADHD RS- IV is widely used in the U.S. in English; however, because of the increasing population of Latino-Americans in the U.S., the ADHD Rating Scale was also translated into Spanish to accommodate those speaking Spanish as their first language. Also, many other countries have already translated and validated the ADHD scale into their primary spoken language. According to the Archives of Clinical Psychiatry in São Paulo, the TDAH (Portuguese abbreviation for ADHD) was fully validated in Brazil by the end of 2006.

Although the ADHD Rating Scale was first designed for children and adolescents, research has demonstrated that it can also be helpful for assessing ADHD symptoms in adults. In a 2008 study, Kooij and associates looked at data from parents and partners of 120 persons with ADHD diagnoses. To find out how well they measured symptoms in adults, the researchers compared a number of ADHD evaluation instruments, such as the ADHD Rating Scale.

According to the study, one of the better methods for predicting a clinical diagnosis of ADHD is the ADHD Rating Scale. Additionally, researchers found that although adults occasionally underestimated the severity of their symptoms, they were generally able to report their own symptoms. Additional information regarding the person's behavior and everyday difficulties may be obtained from family members and other close acquaintances.

These results imply that the ADHD Rating Scale may have applications outside of its initial target demographic. However, rating scales should not be the sole means of diagnosing ADHD; rather, they should be used in conjunction with clinical interviews and other evaluations.

== Limitations ==
Ratings of ADHD symptoms on rating scales in general are subjective. Teachers and parents may use different subjective criteria to define symptoms, and may not take context of symptoms into account when making ratings. Furthermore, the validity of the ARS is acceptable, but the normative sample used to calculate this statistic was composed of children aged 5 to 14, and thus it cannot be generalized beyond age range.

Evaluations of the ADHD Rating Scale's validity have pointed out that the original study used combined ethnic data for participant demographics. Clinicians have emphasized that this is likely to have effected the technical results of ADHD symptoms reported within ethnic minorities, particularly the African-American child population.

According to an accuracy study performed Pediatrics Association in 2016, from all scales they examined the ASQ is the most effective scale that can be used to diagnose the disorder, due to its high brevity and high diagnostic accuracy. A Manual called "Conners Comprehensive Behavior Rating Scales", released in 2017, states that results from discriminative validity analysis showed that the accuracy of the scores to be at 78% across all forms used to diagnose the disorder.

There are also questions about how well items on the ARS follow explicit DSM criteria. Specifically, one of the hyperactivity items does not specify that in adolescents, thoughts of restlessness are sufficient, rather than excessive behavioral movement. This lack of specification does not map directly onto DSM criteria.

This assessment can be accessed by purchasing the ADHD Rating Scale handbook, which includes copies of the Teacher and Parent versions with permission to photocopy for clinical use.

== Also see ==
- Attention-Deficit/Hyperactivity Disorder Investigator Symptom Rating Scale
