= Attention deficit hyperactivity disorder =

Neurodevelopmental disorder

- Other names: Attention-deficit/hyperactivity disorder, attention deficit disorder (ADD), hyperkinetic disorder
- Specialty: Neuropsychiatry; pediatrics
- Symptoms: Inattention; hyperactivity; disinhibition; executive dysfunction; emotional dysregulation; impulsivity; impaired working memory
- Usual onset: Prior to age 12
- Causes: Genetic (inherited, de novo) and to a lesser extent, environmental factors (exposure to biohazards during pregnancy, traumatic brain injury)
- Diagnostic method: Based on impairing symptoms after other possible causes have been ruled out
- Differential diagnosis: Bipolar disorder; cognitive disengagement syndrome; conduct disorder; major depressive disorder; autism spectrum disorder; oppositional defiant disorder; learning disorder; intellectual disability; anxiety disorder; borderline personality disorder; fetal alcohol spectrum disorder
- Treatment: Medication; psychotherapy
- Medication: Stimulants (methylphenidate, amphetamine); selective norepinephrine reuptake inhibitors (atomoxetine, viloxazine); α_{2A}-adrenergic receptor agonists (guanfacine, clonidine)
- Frequency: 0.8–1.5% (2019)

Attention deficit hyperactivity disorder (ADHD) is a neurodevelopmental disorder characterised by symptoms of inattention, hyperactivity, impulsivity, and emotional dysregulation that are excessive and pervasive, impairing in multiple contexts, and developmentally inappropriate. ADHD symptoms arise from executive dysfunction.

Impairments resulting from deficits in self-regulation such as time management, cognitive inhibition, task initiation, and sustained attention can include poor professional performance, relationship difficulties, and numerous health risks, collectively predisposing to a diminished quality of life and a reduction in life expectancy. It is associated with other mental disorders as well as non-psychiatric disorders, which can cause additional impairment.

While ADHD involves a lack of sustained attention to tasks, inhibitory deficits also can lead to difficulty interrupting an ongoing response pattern, manifesting in the perseveration of actions despite a change in context whereby the individual intends the termination of those actions. This symptom is known colloquially as hyperfocus and is related to risks such as addiction and types of offending behaviour. ADHD can be difficult to tell apart from other conditions. ADHD represents the extreme lower end of the continuous dimensional trait (bell curve) of executive functioning and self-regulation, which is supported by twin, brain imaging and molecular genetic studies. ADHD treatment is most effective when medications (primarily stimulants like methylphenidate or amphetamines, as well as non-stimulants such as atomoxetine or alpha-2 agonists) are used, often in combination with psychotherapy; exercise and dietary modifications have no proven benefit.

The precise causes of ADHD are unknown in most individual cases. Meta-analyses have shown that the disorder is primarily genetic with a heritability rate of 70–80%, where risk factors are highly accumulative. The environmental risks are not related to social or familial factors; they exert their effects very early in life, in the prenatal or early postnatal period. However, in rare cases, ADHD can be caused by a single event including traumatic brain injury, exposure to biohazards during pregnancy, or a major genetic mutation. As it is a neurodevelopmental disorder, there is no biologically distinct adult-onset ADHD except for when ADHD occurs after traumatic brain injury.

== Signs and symptoms ==
Inattention, hyperactivity (restlessness in adults), disruptive behaviour, and impulsivity are common in ADHD. Academic difficulties are frequent, as are problems with relationships. A diagnosis can be hard to ascertain, as it is hard to distinguish between normal levels of symptoms and levels that cause significant impairment in major life activities.

According to the fifth edition of the Diagnostic and Statistical Manual of Mental Disorders (DSM-5) and its text revision (DSM-5-TR), symptoms must be present for six months or more to a degree that is much greater than others of the same age. This requires at least six symptoms of either inattention or hyperactivity/impulsivity for those under 17 and at least five symptoms for those 17 years or older. The symptoms must be present in at least two settings (e.g., social, school, work, or home), and must directly interfere with or reduce quality of functioning. Additionally, several symptoms must have been present before age 12 as per DSM-5 criteria. However, research indicates the age of onset should not be interpreted as a prerequisite for diagnosis given contextual exceptions.

=== Presentations ===
ADHD is divided into three primary presentations:

- predominantly inattentive (ADHD-PI or ADHD-I)
- predominantly hyperactive-impulsive (ADHD-PH or ADHD-HI)
- combined presentation (ADHD-C).

The table "Symptoms" lists the symptoms for ADHD-I and ADHD-HI from two major classification systems. Symptoms which can be better explained by another psychiatric or medical condition which an individual has are not considered to be a symptom of ADHD for that person. In DSM-5, subtypes were discarded and reclassified as presentations of the disorder that change over time.

Symptoms
Presentations	DSM-5 and DSM-5-TR symptoms	ICD-11 symptoms
Inattention	Six or more of the following symptoms in children, and five or more in adults, excluding situations where these symptoms are better explained by another psychiatric or medical condition: Frequently overlooks details or makes careless mistakes; Often has difficulty maintaining focus on one task or play activity; Often appears not to be listening when spoken to, including when there is no obvious distraction; Frequently does not finish following instructions, failing to complete tasks; Often struggles to organise tasks and activities, to meet deadlines, and to keep belongings in order; Is frequently reluctant to engage in tasks which require sustained attention; Frequently loses items required for tasks and activities; Is frequently easily distracted by extraneous stimuli, including thoughts in adults and older teenagers; Often forgets daily activities, or is forgetful while completing them.	Multiple symptoms of inattention that directly negatively impact occupational, academic or social functioning. Symptoms may not be present when engaged in highly stimulating tasks with frequent rewards. Symptoms are generally from the following clusters: Struggles to maintain focus on tasks that are not highly stimulating/rewarding or that require continuous effort; details are often missed, and careless mistakes are frequent in school and work tasks; tasks are often abruptly abandoned in favour of another before they are completed.; Easily distracted (including by own thoughts); may not listen when spoken to; frequently appears to be lost in thought; Often loses things; is forgetful and disorganised in daily activities.; The individual may also meet the criteria for hyperactivity-impulsivity, but the inattentive symptoms are predominant.
Hyperactivity-Impulsivity	Six or more of the following symptoms in children, and five or more in adults, excluding situations where these symptoms are better explained by another psychiatric or medical condition: Is often fidgeting or squirming in seat; Frequently has trouble sitting still during dinner, class, in meetings, etc.; Frequently runs around or climbs in inappropriate situations. In adults and teenagers, this may be present only as restlessness.; Often cannot quietly engage in leisure activities or play; Frequently seems to be "on the go" or appears uncomfortable when not in motion; Often talks excessively; Often answers a question before it is finished, or finishes people's sentences; Often struggles to wait their turn, including waiting in lines; Frequently interrupts or intrudes, including into others' conversations or activities, or by using people's things without asking.	Multiple symptoms of hyperactivity/impulsivity that directly negatively impact occupational, academic or social functioning. Typically, these tend to be most apparent in environments with structure or which require self-control. Symptoms are generally from the following clusters: Excessive motor activity; struggles to sit still, often leaving their seat; prefers to run about; in younger children, will fidget when attempting to sit still; in adolescents and adults, a sense of physical restlessness or discomfort with being quiet and still.; Talks too much; struggles to quietly engage in activities.; Blurts out answers or comments; struggles to wait their turn in conversation, games, or activities; will interrupt or intrude on conversations or games.; A lack of forethought or consideration of consequences when making decisions or taking action, instead tending to act immediately (e.g., physically dangerous behaviours including reckless driving; impulsive decisions).; The individual may also meet the criteria for inattention, but the hyperactive-impulsive symptoms are predominant.
Combined	Meet the criteria for both inattentive and hyperactive-impulsive ADHD.	Criteria are met for both inattentive and hyperactive-impulsive ADHD, with neither clearly predominating.

Girls and women with ADHD tend to display fewer hyperactivity and impulsivity symptoms but more symptoms of inattention and distractibility. This inattention can be interpreted being "spacey" or being forgetful, rather than being correctly identified as symptoms of ADHD. Frequently, ADHD symptoms in girls worsen later in childhood, compared with boys, and may be more obvious during times of transition, such as when starting in a new school or beginning puberty.

Symptoms are expressed differently and more subtly as the individual ages. Hyperactivity tends to become less overt with age and turns into inner restlessness, difficulty relaxing or remaining still, talkativeness or constant mental activity in teens and adults with ADHD. Impulsivity in adulthood may appear as thoughtless behaviour, impatience, irresponsible spending and sensation-seeking behaviours, while inattention may appear as becoming easily bored, difficulty with organisation, remaining on task and making decisions, and sensitivity to stress.

Research suggests that ADHD symptoms may fluctuate with the menstrual cycle. One mechanism behind this fluctuation is the rise and fall of ovulation-related hormones, such as progesterone and estrogen, during the menstrual cycle. Many people with ADHD report an increase in symptoms, such as forgetfulness and emotional deregulation, during their pre-menstrual period, when estrogen levels are at their lowest. In a 2025 study, researchers found that 41.1% of women with ADHD also experience premenstrual dysphoric disorder (PMDD), compared with an incidence of 9.8% in a non-ADHD reference group.

==== Characteristics in childhood ====
Difficulties managing anger are more common in children with ADHD, as are delays in speech, language and motor development. Poorer handwriting is more common in children with ADHD. Poor handwriting can be a symptom of ADHD in itself due to decreased attentiveness. When this is a pervasive problem, it may also be attributable to dyslexia or dysgraphia. There is significant overlap in the symptomatologies of ADHD, dyslexia, and dysgraphia, and 3 in 10 people diagnosed with dyslexia experience co-occurring ADHD. Although it causes significant difficulty, many children with ADHD have an attention span equal to or greater than that of other children for tasks and subjects they find interesting.

=== Emotional dysregulation ===
Although not listed as an official symptom, emotional dysregulation or mood lability is generally understood to be a common symptom of ADHD.

=== Relationship difficulties ===
People with ADHD of all ages are more likely to have problems with social skills, such as social interaction and forming and maintaining friendships. This is true for all presentations. About half of children and adolescents with ADHD experience social rejection by their peers compared to 10–15% of non-ADHD children and adolescents. People with attention deficits are prone to having difficulty processing verbal and nonverbal language which can negatively affect social interaction. They may also drift off during conversations, miss social cues, and have trouble learning social skills.

=== Hyperfocus ===
An association between ADHD and hyperfocus, a state characterised by intense and narrow concentration on a specific stimulus, object or task for a prolonged period of time, has been widely reported in the popular science press and media. The phenomenon generally occurs when an individual is engaged in activities they find highly interesting, or which provide instant gratification, such as video games or online chatting. Hyperfocus is not a recognised symptom of ADHD in diagnostic manuals, but is frequently referred to as a symptom of ADHD in academic literature and commonly reported in patients with ADHD in clinical practice. There is a lack of research into hyperfocus in ADHD. Studies in 2016, 2019 and 2024 found that individuals with ADHD diagnoses or self-reported ADHD symptoms experience hyperfocus more often, or more acutely. A 2020 study did not find a higher frequency of hyperfocus in adults with ADHD, although it reported a positive correlation with self-reported ADHD traits. The discrepancy with other studies may reflect varying definitions and conceptions of hyperfocus.

A state of hyperfocus has been hypothesised as being beneficial, allowing individuals to focus on tasks for much longer than is typical. Conversely, it can be difficult to disengage from and shift attention to other stimuli or tasks, leading to excessively prolonged attention. This can lead to neglect of other activities or personal needs, such as eating or using the toilet. It is related to risks such as internet addiction (see § Problematic digital media use) and to some types of offending behaviour. Recent research has linked hyperfocus to the psychological concepts of flow, an enjoyable experience of deep engagement in an activity, and perseveration, difficulty disengaging or switching from an activity.

=== Mind wandering ===
Mind wandering is a situation in which attention drifts from the main task to personal inner thoughts. The connection between mind wandering and ADHD has become a focus of growing research interest. The European Consensus Statement on diagnosis and treatment of adult ADHD (Kooij et al., 2019) identified mind wandering as a common characteristic of adults with ADHD and a strong predictor of the condition, noting that it may be even more predictive than the classic symptoms of inattention or hyperactivity. Studies have consistently found that individuals with ADHD symptoms report significantly more mind wandering than those without ADHD symptoms. Research further indicates that background sounds including music can reduce mind wandering in individuals with elevated ADHD symptoms, suggesting environmental sound as a potential non-pharmacological support strategy. Studies also show that the relationship between ADHD symptoms and mind wandering is detectable as early as kindergarten age, where elevated mind wandering predicts weaker academic performance in arithmetic and phonological tasks.

=== IQ test performance ===
Certain studies have found that people with ADHD tend to have lower scores on intelligence quotient (IQ) tests. The significance of this is controversial due to the differences between people with ADHD and the difficulty determining the influence of symptoms, such as distractibility, on lower scores rather than intellectual capacity. In studies of ADHD, higher IQs may be over-represented because many studies exclude individuals who have lower IQs despite those with ADHD scoring on average nine points lower on standardised intelligence measures. However, other studies contradict this, saying that in individuals with high intelligence, there is an increased risk of a missed ADHD diagnosis, possibly because of compensatory strategies in said individuals.

Studies of adults suggest that negative differences in intelligence are not meaningful and may be explained by associated health problems.

Many IQ tests often use inter-correlation between subtests and the degree of correlation to the "g-constant" and each other as a part of how they measure IQ and test validity. Individuals with ADHD often have disproportionately lower scores in categories relating to working memory and processing speed, which ruins the correlation that those have with IQ and other tasks, necessitating using more resistant sub-tasks like vocabulary tasks in order to get a clear picture on the actual IQ of a patient.

When people with ADHD show discrepancies between certain areas of IQ tests compared to others, it is usually irregularities in sub-tests within sections regarding working memory and processing speed. IQ tests rely on what is known as the g-factor as a way to compare different tests to see how predictive they are of the g-constant (general intelligence), as well as the correlation between other sub-tests on a given test and the predictive power of the g-factor. Some with ADHD may have abnormally low scores on sub-tests that invalidate the full-scale IQ score because the correlation between sub-tests is damaged. The WAIS and WISC have attempted to counter this by introducing a substitute scoring system that only counts sub-tests that are robust against executive dysfunction in studies if a discrepancy occurs.

On the Stanford-Binet, youth with ADHD take longer to complete the test, and have widespread irregularities within sub-tests in working memory domains. On the WAIS, the Arithmetic and Digit Span task was the most affected in ADHD and other disabilities.

As similar deficits and the lack-thereof also exist in individuals with learning disabilities, autism, and other neurodevelopmental disabilities, discrepancies in sub-tests, even if they satisfy the criteria for successful usage for special scales, such as the one on the WAIS and WISC, cannot alone be used as a definitive way to diagnose an individual with ADHD. Many individuals with NDD's will have similar or even more severe deficits. ADHD patients with a naturally high IQ will likely not have visible deficits in working memory on standardised tests that are normed on average individuals, and that cognitive heterogeneity in the ADHD population signals that many with ADHD will not have any visible working memory or processing speed deficits visible.

== Causes ==
ADHD arises from atypical brain development especially in the prefrontal executive networks that can arise either from genetic factors (different gene variants and mutations for building and regulating such networks) or from acquired disruptions to the development of these networks and regions involved in executive functioning and self-regulation. Their reduced size, functional connectivity, and activation contribute to the pathophysiology of ADHD, as well as imbalances in the noradrenergic and dopaminergic systems that mediate these brain regions.

Genetic factors play an important role; ADHD has a heritability rate of 70–80%. The remaining 20–30% of variance is mediated by de-novo mutations and non-shared environmental factors that provide for or produce brain injuries; there is no significant contribution of the rearing family and social environment. Very rarely, ADHD can also be the result of abnormalities in the chromosomes.

=== Genetics ===
Literature reviews published in Biological Psychiatry and in Molecular Psychiatry have found the average heritability estimate of ADHD to be from 0.74 to 0.8, based on family, twin studies, and adoption studies. Additionally, evolutionary psychiatrist Randolph M. Nesse has argued that the 5:1 male-to-female sex ratio in the epidemiology of ADHD suggests that ADHD may be the end of a continuum where males are overrepresented at the tails, citing clinical psychologist Simon Baron-Cohen's suggestion for the sex ratio in the epidemiology of autism as an analogue.

Natural selection has been acting against genetic variants for ADHD over at least 45,000 years, complicating the suggestion that ADHD was adaptive in the human evolutionary past. The disorder may remain at a stable rate by the balance of genetic mutations and removal rate (natural selection) across generations; over thousands of years, these genetic variants become more stable, decreasing disorder prevalence. During human evolution, executive functions disrupted in ADHD likely provide the capacity to bind contingencies across time, thereby directing behaviour toward future over immediate events so as to maximise social consequences for humans.

There are multiple gene variants which each slightly increase the likelihood of a person having ADHD; it is polygenic and thus arises through the accumulation of many genetic risks each having a very small effect. The siblings of children with ADHD are three to four times more likely to develop the disorder than siblings of children without the disorder.

The association of maternal smoking observed in large population studies disappears after adjusting for family history of ADHD, which indicates that the association between maternal smoking during pregnancy and ADHD is due to familial or genetic factors that increase the risk for the confluence of smoking and ADHD.

ADHD presents with reduced size, functional connectivity and activation as well as low noradrenergic and dopaminergic functioning in brain regions and networks crucial for executive functioning and self-regulation. Typically, a number of genes are involved, many of which directly affect brain functioning and neurotransmission. Those involved with dopamine include DAT, DRD4, DRD5, TAAR1, MAOA, COMT, and DBH. Other genes associated with ADHD include SERT, HTR1B, SNAP25, GRIN2A, ADRA2A, TPH2, and BDNF. A common variant of a gene called latrophilin 3 is estimated to be responsible for about 9% of cases and when this variant is present, people are particularly responsive to stimulant medication. The 7 repeat variant of dopamine receptor D4 (DRD4–7R) causes increased inhibitory effects induced by dopamine and is associated with ADHD. The DRD4 receptor is a G protein-coupled receptor that inhibits adenylyl cyclase. The DRD4–7R mutation results in a wide range of behavioural phenotypes, including ADHD symptoms reflecting split attention. The DRD4 gene is both linked to novelty seeking and ADHD. The genes GFOD1 and CDH13 show strong genetic associations with ADHD. CDH13's association with autism spectrum disorder (ASD), schizophrenia, bipolar disorder, and depression make it an interesting candidate causative gene. Another candidate causative gene that has been identified is ADGRL3. In zebrafish, knockout of this gene causes a loss of dopaminergic function in the ventral diencephalon and the fish display a hyperactive/impulsive phenotype.

For genetic variation to be used as a tool for diagnosis, more validating studies need to be performed. However, smaller studies have shown that genetic polymorphisms in genes related to catecholaminergic neurotransmission or the SNARE complex of the synapse can reliably predict a person's response to stimulant medication. Rare genetic variants show more relevant clinical significance as their penetrance (the chance of developing the disorder) tends to be much higher. However their usefulness as tools for diagnosis is limited as no single gene predicts ADHD. ASD shows genetic overlap with ADHD at both common and rare levels of genetic variation.

Evolutionary theorists view ADHD traits (such as novelty-seeking, rapid task-switching, and high exploratory drive) as possible cognitive specialisations that were advantageous in ancestral forager-gatherer environments. In modern structured settings these traits may become mismatched, leading to functional impairment. A recent evolutionary-mismatch hypothesis proposes that high trait curiosity associated with ADHD prepared ancestors to discover new opportunities in unpredictable environments, but in information-saturated, stable modern settings this drive may manifest as distractibility or impulsivity.

=== Environment ===
In addition to genetics, some environmental factors might play a role in causing ADHD. Alcohol intake during pregnancy can cause fetal alcohol spectrum disorders which can include ADHD-like symptoms. Children exposed to certain toxic substances, such as lead or polychlorinated biphenyls, may develop problems which resemble ADHD. Perinatal exposure to the organophosphate insecticides chlorpyrifos and dialkyl phosphate is associated with an increased risk; however, the evidence is not conclusive. Exposure to tobacco smoke during pregnancy can cause problems with central nervous system development and can increase the risk of ADHD. Nicotine exposure during pregnancy may be an environmental risk.

Extreme premature birth, very low birth weight, and extreme neglect, abuse, or social deprivation also increase the risk as do certain infections during pregnancy, at birth, and in early childhood. These infections include, among others, various viruses (measles, varicella zoster encephalitis, rubella, enterovirus 71). At least 30% of children with a traumatic brain injury later develop ADHD and about 5% of cases are due to brain damage.

Some studies suggest that in a small number of children, artificial food dyes or preservatives may be associated with an increased prevalence of ADHD or ADHD-like symptoms, but the evidence is weak and may apply to only children with food sensitivities. The European Union has put in place regulatory measures based on these concerns. In a minority of children, intolerances or allergies to certain foods may worsen ADHD symptoms.

Individuals with hypokalemic sensory overstimulation are sometimes diagnosed as having ADHD, raising the possibility that a subtype of ADHD has a cause that can be understood mechanistically and treated in a novel way. The sensory overload is treatable with oral potassium gluconate.

Research does not support popular beliefs that ADHD is caused by eating too much refined sugar, watching too much television, bad parenting, poverty or family chaos; however, they might worsen ADHD symptoms in certain people.

Children who enter school earlier and are of a younger age than their classmates are more likely to have educational and behavioural problems than their peers, which can make them more likely to be diagnosed with ADHD. Behaviours typical of ADHD occur more commonly in children who have experienced violence and emotional abuse.

== Mechanism ==
Current models of ADHD suggest that it is associated with functional impairments in some of the brain's neurotransmitter systems, particularly those involving dopamine and norepinephrine. The dopamine and norepinephrine pathways that originate in the ventral tegmental area and locus coeruleus project to diverse regions of the brain and govern a variety of cognitive processes. The dopamine pathways and norepinephrine pathways which project to the prefrontal cortex and striatum are directly responsible for modulating executive function (cognitive control of behaviour), motivation, reward perception, and motor function; these pathways are known to play a central role in the pathophysiology of ADHD. Larger models of ADHD with additional pathways have been proposed.

=== Brain structure ===
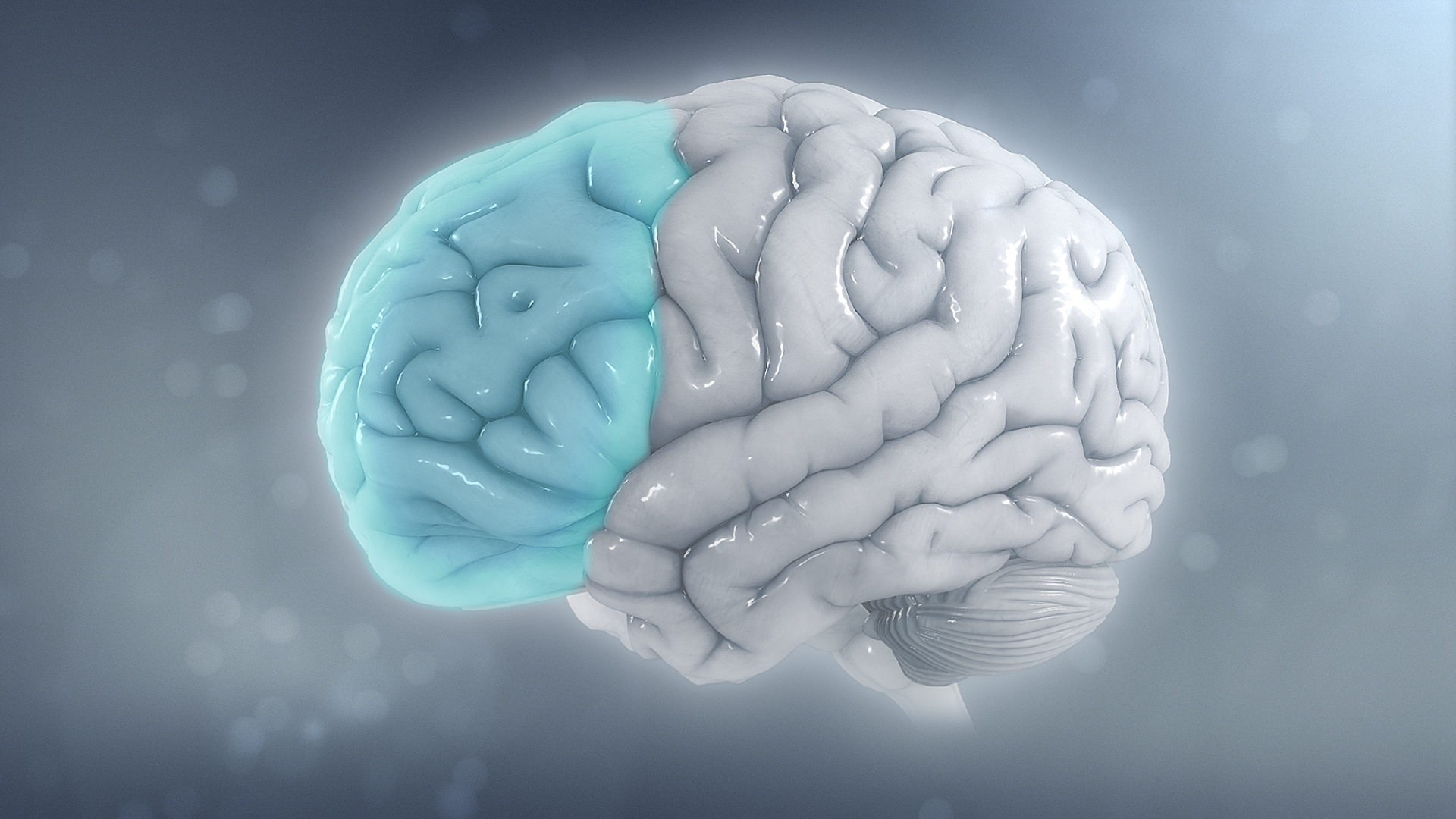
The left prefrontal cortex, shown here in blue, is often affected in ADHD.

In children with ADHD, there is a general reduction of volume in certain brain structures, with a proportionally greater decrease in the volume in the left-sided prefrontal cortex. The posterior parietal cortex also shows thinning in individuals with ADHD compared to controls. Other brain structures in the prefrontal-striatal-cerebellar and prefrontal-striatal-thalamic circuits have also been found to differ between people with and without ADHD.

The subcortical volumes of the accumbens, amygdala, caudate, hippocampus, and putamen appears smaller in individuals with ADHD compared with controls. Structural MRI studies have also revealed differences in white matter, with marked differences in inter-hemispheric asymmetry between ADHD and typically developing youths.

Functional MRI (fMRI) studies have revealed a number of differences between ADHD and control brains. Mirroring what is known from structural findings, fMRI studies have shown evidence for a higher connectivity between subcortical and cortical regions, such as between the caudate and prefrontal cortex. The degree of hyperconnectivity between these regions correlated with the severity of inattention or hyperactivity. Hemispheric lateralisation processes have also been postulated as being implicated in ADHD, but empiric results showed contrasting evidence on the topic.

=== Neurotransmitter pathways ===
Previously, it had been suggested that the elevated number of dopamine transporters in people with ADHD was part of the pathophysiology, but it appears the elevated numbers may be due to adaptation following exposure to stimulant medication. Current models involve the mesocorticolimbic dopamine pathway and the locus coeruleus-noradrenergic system. ADHD psychostimulants possess treatment efficacy because they increase neurotransmitter activity in these systems. There may additionally be abnormalities in serotonergic, glutamatergic, or cholinergic pathways.

PET mapping of neocortex receptor distribution indicates that the distribution of μ-opioid receptors is the strongest contributor to cortical abnormalities in ADHD, followed by CB_{1} cannabinoid receptors.

=== Executive function and motivation ===
ADHD arises from a core deficit in executive functions (e.g., attentional control, inhibitory control, and working memory), which are a set of cognitive processes that are required to successfully select and monitor behaviours that facilitate the attainment of one's chosen goals. The executive function impairments that occur in ADHD individuals result in problems with staying organised, time keeping, procrastination control, maintaining concentration, paying attention, ignoring distractions, regulating emotions, and remembering details. People with ADHD appear to have unimpaired long-term memory, and deficits in long-term recall appear to be attributed to impairments in working memory. Due to the rates of brain maturation and the increasing demands for executive control as a person gets older, ADHD impairments may not fully manifest themselves until adolescence or even early adulthood. Conversely, brain maturation trajectories, potentially exhibiting diverging longitudinal trends in ADHD, may support a later improvement in executive functions after reaching adulthood.

ADHD has also been associated with motivational deficits in children. Children with ADHD often find it difficult to focus on long-term over short-term rewards, and exhibit impulsive behaviour for short-term rewards.

=== Paradoxical reaction to neuroactive substances ===
Another sign of the structurally altered signal processing in the central nervous system in this group of people is the conspicuously common paradoxical reaction (c. 10–20% of patients). These are unexpected reactions in the opposite direction as with a normal effect, or otherwise significant different reactions. These are reactions to neuroactive substances such as local anesthetic at the dentist, sedative, caffeine, antihistamine, weak neuroleptics and central and peripheral painkillers. Since the causes of paradoxical reactions are at least partly genetic, it may be useful in critical situations, for example before operations, to ask whether such abnormalities may also exist in family members.

== Diagnosis ==
ADHD is diagnosed by an assessment of a person's behavioural and mental development, including ruling out the effects of drugs, medications, and other medical or psychiatric problems as explanations for the symptoms. Childhood and adolescent ADHD diagnosis often takes into account feedback from parents and teachers with most diagnoses begun after a teacher raises concerns. While many tools exist to aid in the diagnosis of ADHD, their validity varies in different populations, and a reliable and valid diagnosis requires confirmation by a clinician while supplemented by standardised rating scales and input from multiple informants across various settings. Most diagnosis in children is seen in low-income families, and more in Caucasian children in comparison to Black, Hispanic, and Asian children, however, the diagnosis may be influenced by racial and socio-economic biases.

The diagnosis of ADHD has been criticised as being subjective because it is not based on a biological test. The International Consensus Statement on ADHD concluded that this criticism is unfounded, on the basis that ADHD meets standard criteria for validity of a mental disorder established by Robins and Guze. They attest that the disorder is considered valid because: 1) well-trained professionals in a variety of settings and cultures agree on its presence or absence using well-defined criteria and 2) the diagnosis is useful for predicting a) additional problems the patient may have (e.g., difficulties learning in school); b) future patient outcomes (e.g., risk for future drug abuse); c) response to treatment (e.g., medications and psychological treatments); and d) features that indicate a consistent set of causes for the disorder (e.g., findings from genetics or brain imaging), and that professional associations have endorsed and published guidelines for diagnosing ADHD.

The most commonly used rating scales for diagnosing ADHD in children are the Achenbach System of Empirically Based Assessment (ASEBA) and include the Child Behavior Checklist (CBCL) used for parents to rate their child's behaviour, the Youth Self Report Form (YSR) used for children to rate their own behaviour, and the Teacher Report Form (TRF) used for teachers to rate their pupil's behaviour. Additional rating scales that have been used alone or in combination with other measures to diagnose ADHD include the Behavior Assessment System for Children (BASC), Behavior Rating Inventory of Executive Function - Second Edition (BRIEF2), Revised Conners Rating Scale (CRS-R), Conduct-Hyperactive-Attention Problem-Oppositional Symptom scale (CHAOS), Developmental Behavior Checklist Hyperactivity Index (DBC-HI), Parent Disruptive Behavior Disorder Ratings Scale (DBDRS), Diagnostic Infant and Preschool Assessment (DIPA-L), Pediatric Symptom Checklist (PSC), Social Communication Questionnaire (SCQ), Social Responsiveness Scale (SRS), Strengths and Weaknesses of ADHD Symptoms and Normal Behavior Rating Scale (SWAN) and the Vanderbilt ADHD Diagnostic Rating Scale.

The ASEBA, BASC, CHAOS, CRS, and Vanderbilt diagnostic rating scales allow for both parents and teachers as raters in the diagnosis of childhood and adolescent ADHD. Adolescents may also self report their symptoms using self report scales from the ASEBA, SWAN, and the Dominic Interactive for Adolescents-Revised (DIA-R). Self-rating scales, such as the ADHD Rating Scale and the Vanderbilt ADHD Diagnostic Rating Scale, are used in the screening and evaluation of ADHD.

Based on a 2024 systematic literature review and meta analysis commissioned by the Patient-Centered Outcomes Research Institute (PCORI), rating scales based on parent report, teacher report, or self-assessment from the adolescent have high internal consistency as a diagnostic tool meaning that the items within the scale are highly interrelated. The reliability of the scales between raters (i.e. their degree of agreement) however is poor to moderate making it important to include information from multiple raters to best inform a diagnosis.

Imaging studies of the brain do not give consistent results between individuals; thus, they are only used for research purposes and not a diagnosis. Electroencephalography is not accurate enough to make an ADHD diagnosis. A 2024 systematic review concluded that the use of biomarkers such as blood or urine samples, electroencephalogram (EEG) markers, and neuroimaging such as MRIs, in diagnosis for ADHD remains unclear; studies showed great variability, did not assess test-retest reliability, and were not independently replicable.

In North America and Australia, DSM-5 criteria are used for diagnosis, while European countries usually use the ICD-11 criteria. ADHD is alternately classified as a neurodevelopmental disorder or a disruptive behaviour disorder along with ODD, CD, and antisocial personality disorder. A diagnosis does not imply a neurological disorder.

Very few studies have been conducted on diagnosis of ADHD on children younger than 7 years of age, and those that have were found in a 2024 systematic review to be of low or insufficient strength of evidence. A 2024 systematic review commissioned by the Patient-Centered Outcomes Research Institute (PCORI) highlighted that although a variety of diagnostic approaches show potential, there is substantial variability in their performance across studies. The same review found that many studies did not include information on the impact associated with a misdiagnosis or the downsides of administering diagnostic assessments. The CBCL and Disruptive Behavior Diagnostic Observation Schedule (DB-DOS) showed good performance, while BRIEF worked very well. However, there are not enough studies on children younger than 7 years of age to determine which diagnosis method is the most effective. The review emphasized that diagnostic accuracy often depends on the comparison group—specifically, whether children with ADHD are being distinguished from typically developing peers or from other clinically referred youth. About half of the diagnostic studies in the review evaluated clinical samples, defined as children undergoing diagnostic workup for a potential diagnosis of ADHD, conduct disorders, autism, or depression, rather than typically developing children. Multiple informants (such as parents, teachers, and the youth themselves) may be necessary to improve diagnostic accuracy due to poor-to-moderate agreement between raters.

Research has found differences in the presentation and diagnosis of attention-deficit/hyperactivity disorder (ADHD) in girls and women compared with boys and men. Girls with ADHD are more likely to exhibit inattentive symptoms, which may be less noticeable to parents and teachers than overt hyperactivity or impulsivity. These differences in symptom presentation, along with the use of compensatory strategies, may contribute to delayed recognition and diagnosis in females. A review of research on ADHD in girls and women found that girls met diagnostic criteria at less than half the rate of boys, although the ratio became more similar by adulthood.

=== Classification ===
==== Diagnostic and Statistical Manual ====
As with many other psychiatric disorders, a formal diagnosis should be made by a qualified professional based on a set number of criteria. In the United States, these criteria are defined by the American Psychiatric Association in the DSM. Based on the DSM-5 criteria published in 2013 and the DSM-5-TR criteria published in 2022, there are three presentations of ADHD:

1. ADHD, predominantly inattentive presentation, presents with symptoms including being easily distracted, forgetful, daydreaming, disorganisation, poor sustained attention, and difficulty completing tasks.
2. ADHD, predominantly hyperactive-impulsive presentation, presents with excessive fidgeting and restlessness, hyperactivity, and difficulty waiting and remaining seated.
3. ADHD, combined presentation, is a combination of the first two presentations.

This subdivision is based on presence of at least six (in children) or five (in older teenagers and adults) out of nine long-term (lasting at least six months) symptoms of inattention, hyperactivity–impulsivity, or both. To be considered, several symptoms must have appeared by the age of six to twelve and occur in more than one environment (e.g. at home and at school or work). The symptoms must be inappropriate for a child of that age and there must be clear evidence that they are causing impairment in multiple domains of life.

The DSM-5 and the DSM-5-TR also provide two diagnoses for individuals who have symptoms of ADHD but do not entirely meet the requirements. Other Specified ADHD allows the clinician to describe why the individual does not meet the criteria, whereas Unspecified ADHD is used where the clinician chooses not to describe the reason.

==== International Classification of Diseases ====
In the eleventh revision of the International Statistical Classification of Diseases and Related Health Problems (ICD-11) by the World Health Organization, the disorder is classified as Attention deficit hyperactivity disorder (code 6A05). The defined subtypes are predominantly inattentive presentation (6A05.0); predominantly hyperactive-impulsive presentation (6A05.1); and combined presentation (6A05.2). However, the ICD-11 includes two residual categories for individuals who do not entirely match any of the defined subtypes: other specified presentation (6A05.Y) where the clinician includes detail on the individual's presentation; and presentation unspecified (6A05.Z) where the clinician does not provide detail.

In the tenth revision (ICD-10), the symptoms of hyperkinetic disorder were analogous to ADHD in the ICD-11. When a conduct disorder (as defined by ICD-10) is present, the condition was referred to as hyperkinetic conduct disorder. Otherwise, the disorder was classified as disturbance of activity and attention, other hyperkinetic disorders or hyperkinetic disorders, unspecified. The latter was sometimes referred to as hyperkinetic syndrome.

==== Social construct theory ====
The social construct theory of ADHD suggests that, because the boundaries between normal and abnormal behaviour are socially constructed (i.e. jointly created and validated by all members of society, and in particular by physicians, parents, teachers, and others), it then follows that subjective valuations and judgements determine which diagnostic criteria are used and thus, the number of people affected. Thomas Szasz, a supporter of this theory, has argued that ADHD was "invented and then given a name".

=== Adults ===
Adults with ADHD are diagnosed under the same criteria, including that their signs must have been present by the age of six to twelve. The individual is the best source for information in diagnosis, however others may provide useful information about the individual's symptoms currently and in childhood; a family history of ADHD also adds weight to a diagnosis. Certain assessments, such as the Wender Utah Rating Scale (WURS), attempt to assess these childhood ADHD symptoms by having adults retrospectively recall their experiences as children. While the core symptoms of ADHD are similar in children and adults, they often present differently in adults than in children: for example, excessive physical activity seen in children may present as feelings of restlessness and constant mental activity in adults.

Worldwide, it is estimated that 2.58% of adults have persistent ADHD (where the individual currently meets the criteria and there is evidence of childhood onset), and 6.76% of adults have symptomatic ADHD (meaning that they currently meet the criteria for ADHD, regardless of childhood onset). In 2020, this was 139.84 million and 366.33 million affected adults respectively. About 15% of children with ADHD continue to meet full DSM-IV-TR criteria at 25 years of age, and 50% still experience some symptoms. As of 2010, most adults remain untreated. Many adults with ADHD without diagnosis and treatment have a disorganised life, and some use non-prescribed drugs or alcohol as a coping mechanism. Other problems may include relationship and job difficulties, and an increased risk of criminal activities. Associated mental health problems include depression, anxiety disorders, and learning disabilities.

Some ADHD symptoms in adults differ from those seen in children. While children with ADHD may climb and run about excessively, adults may experience an inability to relax, or may talk excessively in social situations. Adults with ADHD may start relationships impulsively, display sensation-seeking behaviour, and be short-tempered. Addictive behaviour such as substance abuse and gambling are common. Previously, changes in ADHD presentation over time led to those diagnosed as children appearing to have outgrown the DSM-IV criteria. The DSM-5 addresses this issue by differentiating childhood and adult diagnostic criteria, a marked departure from the DSM-IV, which did not fully take into account the differences in impairments seen in adulthood compared to childhood.

For diagnosis in an adult, the presence of symptoms since childhood is generally required. However, a proportion of adults who meet the criteria for ADHD in adulthood would not have been diagnosed with ADHD as children. Most cases of late-onset ADHD develop the disorder between the ages of 12–16 and may therefore be considered early adult or adolescent-onset ADHD.

=== Differential diagnosis ===
Symptoms related to other disorders
Depressive disorder	Anxiety disorder	Bipolar disorder
feelings of hopelessness, low self-esteem, or unhappiness; loss of interest in hobbies or regular activities; fatigue; sleep problems; difficulty maintaining attention; change in appetite; irritability or hostility; low tolerance for stress; thoughts of death; unexplained pain	persistent feeling of anxiety; irritability; occasional feelings of panic or fear; hypervigilance; inability to pay attention; tire easily; low tolerance for stress; difficulty maintaining attention	in manic state: excessive happiness; hyperactivity; racing thoughts; aggression; excessive talking; grandiose delusions; decreased need for sleep; inappropriate social behaviour; difficulty maintaining attention; in depressive state: same symptoms as in depression section

The DSM provides differential diagnoses – potential alternate explanations for specific symptoms. Assessment and investigation of clinical history determines which is the most appropriate diagnosis. The DSM-5 suggests oppositional defiant disorder, intermittent explosive disorder, and other disorders such as stereotypic movement disorder and Tourette syndrome, in addition to specific learning disorder, intellectual disability, autism, reactive attachment disorder, anxiety disorders, depressive disorders, bipolar disorder, disruptive mood dysregulation disorder, substance use disorder, personality disorders, psychotic disorders, medication-induced symptoms, and neurocognitive disorders. Many but not all of these are also common comorbidities of ADHD. The DSM-5-TR also suggests post-traumatic stress disorder.

Symptoms of ADHD that particularly relate to disinhibition and irritability in addition to low-mood and self-esteem as a result of symptom expression might be confusable with dysthymia and bipolar disorder as well as with borderline personality disorder, however they are comorbid at a significantly increased rate relative to the general population. Some symptoms that are viewed superficially due to anxiety disorders, intellectual disability or the effects of substance abuse such as intoxication and withdrawal can overlap to some extent with ADHD symptoms. These disorders can also occur along with ADHD.

Primary sleep disorders may affect attention and behaviour and the symptoms of ADHD may affect sleep. It is thus recommended that children with ADHD be regularly assessed for sleep problems. Sleepiness in children may result in symptoms ranging from the classic ones of yawning and rubbing the eyes, to disinhibition and inattention. Obstructive sleep apnea can also cause ADHD-like symptoms.

In general, the DSM-5-TR can help distinguish between many conditions associated with ADHD-like symptoms by the context in which the symptoms arise. For example, children with learning disabilities may feel distractable and agitated when asked to engage in tasks that require the impaired skill (e.g., reading, math), but not in other situations. A person with an intellectual disability may develop symptoms that overlap with ADHD when placed in a school environment that is inappropriate for their needs. The type of inattention implicated in ADHD, of poor persistence and sustained attention, differs substantially from selective or oriented inattention seen in cognitive disengagement syndrome (CDS), as well as from rumination, reexperiencing or mind blanking seen in anxiety disorders or PTSD.

In mood disorders, ADHD-like symptoms may be limited to manic or depressive states of an episodic nature. Symptoms overlapping with ADHD in psychotic disorders may be limited to psychotic states. Substance use disorder, some medications, and certain medical conditions may cause symptoms to appear later in life, while ADHD, as a neurodevelopmental disorder, requires for them to have been present since childhood.

A careful understanding of the symptoms may help establish the difference between ADHD and other disorders. For example, the forgetfulness and impulsivity typical of ADHD (e.g., in completing school assignments or following directions) may be distinguished from opposition when there is no hostility or defiance, although ADHD and ODD are highly comorbid. Tantrums may differ from the outbursts in intermittent explosive disorder if there is no aggression involved. The fidgetiness observed in ADHD may be differentiated from tics or stereotypies common in Tourette syndrome or autism.

Also, the social difficulties often experienced by individuals with ADHD due to inattention (e.g., being unfocused during the interaction and therefore missing cues or being unaware of one's behaviour) or impulsivity (blurting things out, asking intrusive questions, interrupting) may be contrasted with the social detachment and deficits in understanding social cues associated with Autism Spectrum Disorder. Individuals with ADHD may also present signs of the social impairment or emotional and cognitive dysregulation seen in personality disorders, but not necessarily such features as a fear of abandonment, an unstable sense of self, narcissistic tendencies, aggressiveness, or other personality features.

While it is possible and common for many of these different conditions to be comorbid with ADHD, the symptoms must not be better explained by them, as per diagnostic criterion E in the DSM-5. The symptoms must arise early in life, appear across multiple environments, and cause significant impairment. Moreover, when some of these conditions are in fact comorbid with ADHD, it is still important to distinguish them, as each may need to be treated separately.

== Comorbidities ==
=== Psychiatric comorbidities ===
Nearly 78% of children with ADHD have at least one other co-occurring condition, according to data collected in 2022 by the U.S. Centers for Disease Control and Prevention.

Other neurodevelopmental conditions are common comorbidities. Autism spectrum disorder (ASD), co-occurring at a rate of 21% in those with ADHD, affects social skills, ability to communicate, behaviour, and interests. Learning disabilities have been found to occur in about 20–30% of children with ADHD. Learning disabilities can include developmental speech and language disorders, and academic skills disorders. ADHD, however, is not considered a learning disability, but it very frequently causes academic difficulties. Intellectual disabilities and Tourette syndrome are also common.

ADHD is often comorbid with disruptive, impulse control, and conduct disorders. Oppositional defiant disorder (ODD) occurs in about 25% of children with an inattentive presentation and 50% of those with a combined presentation. It is characterised by angry or irritable mood, argumentative or defiant behaviour and vindictiveness which are age-inappropriate. Conduct disorder (CD) is another common comorbid disorder of adolescents with ADHD, and occurs in 25% of individuals with combined presentation. It is characterised by aggression, destruction of property, deceitfulness, theft and violations of rules. Adolescents with ADHD who also have CD are more likely to develop antisocial personality disorder in adulthood. Brain imaging supports that CD and ADHD are separate conditions: conduct disorder was shown to reduce the size of one's temporal lobe and limbic system, and increase the size of one's orbitofrontal cortex, whereas ADHD was shown to reduce connections in the cerebellum and prefrontal cortex more broadly. Conduct disorder involves more impairment in motivation control than ADHD. Intermittent explosive disorder is characterised by sudden and disproportionate outbursts of anger and co-occurs in individuals with ADHD more frequently than in the general population.

Borderline personality disorder frequently co-occurs with ADHD, and is a common comorbidity for people with ADHD. Recent studies have shown the comorbidity rates of BPD associated with ADHD is of 30–60%, with shared features of emotion dysregulation and impulsivity driving the overlap. Furthermore, among people with ADHD, the lifetime rate of BPD was 37.7% according to a JAMA review of BPD epidemiology. A prospective follow-up study by Miller et al. tracked 96 adolescents with childhood ADHD into late adolescence/early adulthood and found that the odds ratio for developing BPD was 13.16 compared to 3.03 for ASPD in those with childhood ADHD, suggesting BPD risk is substantially greater than ASPD risk in general ADHD populations. which makes BPD the most prevalent personality disorder associated with ADHD.

Anxiety and mood disorders are frequent comorbidities. Anxiety disorders have been found to occur more commonly in the ADHD population, as have mood disorders (especially bipolar disorder and major depressive disorder). While boys tend to present with comorbidities that involve externalization, girls tend to internalise their symptoms, leading to the possibility of increased misdiagnosis via standards designed to recognise male ADHD. Adults and children with ADHD sometimes also have bipolar disorder, which requires careful assessment to accurately diagnose and treat both conditions.

Sleep disorders and ADHD commonly co-exist. They can also occur as a side effect of medications used to treat ADHD. In children with ADHD, insomnia is the most common sleep disorder with behavioural therapy being the preferred treatment. Problems with sleep initiation are common among individuals with ADHD but often they will be deep sleepers and have significant difficulty getting up in the morning. Melatonin is sometimes used in children who have sleep onset insomnia. Restless legs syndrome has been found to be more common in those with ADHD and is often due to iron-deficiency anaemia. However, restless legs can simply be a part of ADHD and requires careful assessment to differentiate between the two disorders. Delayed sleep phase disorder is also a common comorbidity.

Individuals with ADHD are at increased risk of substance use disorders. This is most commonly seen with alcohol or cannabis. The reason for this may be an altered reward pathway in the brains of ADHD individuals, self-treatment and increased psychosocial risk factors. This makes the evaluation and treatment of ADHD more difficult, with serious substance misuse problems usually treated first due to their greater risks. Other psychiatric conditions include reactive attachment disorder, characterised by a severe inability to appropriately relate socially, and cognitive disengagement syndrome, a distinct attention disorder occurring in 30–50% of ADHD cases as a comorbidity, regardless of the presentation; a subset of cases diagnosed with ADHD-PI have been found to have CDS instead. Individuals with ADHD are three times more likely to be diagnosed with an eating disorder compared to those without ADHD; conversely, individuals with eating disorders are twice as likely to have ADHD than those without eating disorders.

=== Trauma ===
ADHD, trauma, and adverse childhood experiences are also comorbid, which could in part be potentially explained by the similarity in presentation between different diagnoses. The symptoms of ADHD and PTSD can have significant behavioural overlap—in particular, motor restlessness, difficulty concentrating, distractibility, irritability/anger, emotional constriction or dysregulation, poor impulse control, and forgetfulness are common in both. This could result in trauma-related disorders or ADHD being mis-identified as the other. Additionally, traumatic events in childhood are a risk factor for ADHD; they can lead to structural brain changes and the development of ADHD behaviours. Finally, the behavioural consequences of ADHD symptoms cause a higher chance of the individual experiencing trauma (and therefore ADHD leads to a concrete diagnosis of a trauma-related disorder).

=== Non-psychiatric ===
Some non-psychiatric conditions are also comorbidities of ADHD. This includes epilepsy, a neurological condition characterised by recurrent seizures. There are well established associations between ADHD and obesity, asthma and sleep disorders, and an association with celiac disease. Children with ADHD have a higher risk for migraine headaches, but have no increased risk of tension-type headaches. Children with ADHD may also experience headaches as a result of medication.

A 2021 review reported that several neurometabolic disorders caused by inborn errors of metabolism converge on common neurochemical mechanisms that interfere with biological mechanisms also considered central in ADHD pathophysiology and treatment. This highlights the importance of close collaboration between health services to avoid clinical overshadowing.

In June 2021, Neuroscience & Biobehavioral Reviews published a systematic review of 82 studies that all confirmed or implied elevated accident-proneness in ADHD patients, and whose data suggested that the type of accidents or injuries—and overall risk—changes over the lifespan of ADHD patients. In January 2014, Accident Analysis & Prevention published a meta-analysis of 16 studies examining the relative risk of traffic collisions for drivers with ADHD, finding an overall relative risk estimate of 1.36 without controlling for exposure, a relative risk estimate of 1.29 when controlling for publication bias, a relative risk estimate of 1.23 when controlling for exposure, and a relative risk estimate of 1.86 for ADHD drivers with oppositional defiant disorder or conduct disorder comorbidities.

=== Problematic digital media use ===
Meta-analysis and systematic reviews of studies have shown a link between internet use, gaming disorders, social media use, and ADHD or symptoms of ADHD including impulsive traits; however, associations and causality are not clear. There is some evidence of a bi-directional relationship in which people with ADHD may be more likely to engage with problematic internet or gaming use, and higher digital media use may worsen existing ADHD symptoms. An important group to talk about regarding the relationship between ADHD and digital media is adolescents, a meta-analysis has shown that it is more common for adolescents to have problematic gaming if they also have ADHD, it also showed results indicating that ADHD may predict future problematic gaming as well.

=== Suicide risk ===
Systematic reviews in 2017 and 2020 found strong evidence that ADHD is associated with increased suicide risk across all age groups, as well as growing evidence that an ADHD diagnosis in childhood or adolescence represents a significant future suicidal risk factor. Potential causes include ADHD's association with functional impairment, negative social, educational and occupational outcomes, and financial distress. A 2019 meta-analysis indicated a significant association between ADHD and suicidal spectrum behaviours (suicidal attempts, ideations, plans, and completed suicides); across the studies examined, the prevalence of suicide attempts in individuals with ADHD was 18.9%, compared to 9.3% in individuals without ADHD, and the findings were substantially replicated among studies which adjusted for other variables. However, the relationship between ADHD and suicidal spectrum behaviours remains unclear due to mixed findings across individual studies and the complicating impact of comorbid psychiatric disorders. There is no clear data on whether there is a direct relationship between ADHD and suicidality, or whether ADHD increases suicide risk through comorbidities.

=== Rejection sensitive dysphoria ===
Rejection sensitivity is a heightened sensitivity to social rejection. The term "rejection sensitive dysphoria" was coined in relation to ADHD, but it's not a clinically validated feature of ADHD. It is not clear whether it is specific to ADHD or the result of adverse experiences, and whether it is more common in people with ADHD on average. Some posit that rejection sensitivity stems from early attachment relationships and parental rejection; peer rejection is also thought to play a role. Bullying, an extreme form of peer rejection, is thought to be connected to later rejection sensitivity. However, there is no conclusive evidence for any of these theories.

== Management ==
The management of ADHD typically involves counselling or medications, either alone or in combination. While there are various options of treatment to improve ADHD symptoms, medication therapies substantially improve long-term outcomes, and while eliminating some elevated risks such as obesity, they do come with some risks of adverse events. Medications used include stimulants, atomoxetine, alpha-2 adrenergic receptor agonists, and sometimes antidepressants. In those who have trouble focusing on long-term rewards, a large amount of positive reinforcement improves task performance. Medications are the most effective treatment, and any side effects are typically mild and easy to resolve although any improvements will be reverted if medication is ceased. ADHD stimulants also improve persistence and task performance in children with ADHD. To quote one systematic review, "recent evidence from observational and registry studies indicates that pharmacological treatment of ADHD is associated with increased achievement and decreased absenteeism at school, a reduced risk of trauma-related emergency hospital visits, reduced risks of suicide and attempted suicide, and decreased rates of substance abuse and criminality". Data also suggest that combining medication with cognitive behavioural therapy (CBT) can have positive effects: although CBT is substantially less effective, it can help address problems that reside after medication has been optimised. The nature and range of desirable endpoints of ADHD treatment vary among diagnostic standards for ADHD. In most studies, the efficacy of treatment is determined by reductions in symptoms. However, some studies have included subjective ratings from teachers and parents as part of their assessment of treatment efficacies.

=== Behavioural therapies ===
There is strong evidence for the use of behavioural therapies in ADHD. They are the recommended first-line treatment in those who have mild symptoms or who are preschool-aged. Psychological therapies used include: psychoeducational input, behaviour therapy, cognitive behavioural therapy, interpersonal psychotherapy, family therapy, school-based interventions, social skills training, behavioural peer intervention, organisation training, and parent management training. Parent training may improve a number of behavioural problems including oppositional and non-compliant behaviours. Recent research suggests that mindfulness-based interventions can lead to significant improvements in self-reported and observer-rated ADHD symptoms, as well as functional outcomes in both adults and children.

Neurofeedback for ADHD is controversial, and the literature is mixed. It appears to not be clinically significant.

There is little high-quality research on the effectiveness of family therapy for ADHD—but the existing evidence shows that it is similar to community care, and better than placebo. ADHD-specific support groups can provide information and may help families cope with ADHD.

Social skills training, behavioural modification, and medication may have some limited beneficial effects in peer relationships. Stable, high-quality friendships with non-deviant peers protect against later psychological problems.

=== Digital interventions ===
Several clinical trials have investigated the efficacy of digital therapeutics, particularly Akili Interactive Labs's video game-based digital therapeutic AKL-T01, marketed as EndeavourRx. The paediatric STARS-ADHD randomised, double-blind, parallel-group, controlled trial demonstrated that AKL-T01 significantly improved performance on the Test of Variables of Attention, an objective measure of attention and inhibitory control, compared to a control group after four weeks of at-home use. A subsequent paediatric open-label study, STARS-Adjunct, published in Nature Portfolio's npj Digital Medicine evaluated AKL-T01 as an adjunctive treatment for children with ADHD who were either on stimulant medication or not on stimulant pharmacotherapy. Results showed improvements in ADHD-related impairment (measured by the Impairment Rating Scale) and ADHD symptoms after 4 weeks of treatment, with effects persisting during a 4-week pause and further improving with an additional treatment period. Notably, the magnitude of the measured improvement was similar for children both on and off stimulants. In 2020, AKL-T01 received marketing authorisation for paediatric ADHD from the FDA, becoming "the first game-based therapeutic granted marketing authorisation by the FDA for any type of condition."

In addition to paediatric populations, a 2023 study in the Journal of the American Academy of Child & Adolescent Psychiatry investigated the efficacy and safety of AKL-T01 in adults with ADHD. After six weeks of at-home treatment with AKL-T01, participants showed significant improvements in objective measures of attention (TOVA - Attention Comparison Score), reported ADHD symptoms (ADHD-RS-IV inattention subscale and total score), and reported quality of life (AAQoL). The magnitude of improvement in attention was nearly seven times greater than that reported in paediatric trials. The treatment was well-tolerated, with high compliance and no serious adverse events.

=== Medication ===
The medications for ADHD appear to alleviate symptoms via their effects on the pre-frontal executive, striatal, and related regions and networks in the brain; usually by increasing neurotransmission of norepinephrine and dopamine.

According to Effective Health Care Systematic Review, FDA-approved stimulant and non-stimulant medications shows sufficient evidence showing that they greatly improve the core symptoms of ADHD. For clinicians considering a second ADHD medication for a child or adolescent, a systematic review evidence update found insufficient evidence that combining medications provides greater benefit than using one medication alone.

==== Stimulants ====
Methylphenidate and amphetamine or its derivatives are often first-line treatments for ADHD. About 70% respond to the first stimulant tried and as few as 10% respond to neither amphetamines nor methylphenidate. Stimulants may also reduce the risk of unintentional injuries in children with ADHD. Magnetic resonance imaging studies suggest that long-term treatment with amphetamine or methylphenidate decreases abnormalities in brain structure and function found in subjects with ADHD. A 2018 review found the greatest short-term benefit with methylphenidate in children, and amphetamines in adults. Studies and meta-analyses show that amphetamine is slightly-to-modestly more effective than methylphenidate at reducing symptoms, and they are more effective pharmacotherapy for ADHD than α_{2}-agonists but methylphenidate has comparable efficacy to non-stimulants such as atomoxetine. In a Cochrane clinical synopsis, Dr. Storebø and colleagues summarised their meta-review on methylphenidate for ADHD in children and adolescents. The meta-analysis raised substantial doubts about the drug's efficacy relative to a placebo. This led to a strong critical reaction from the European ADHD Guidelines Group and individuals in the scientific community, who identified a number of flaws in the review. Since at least September 2021, there is a unanimous and global scientific consensus that methylphenidate is safe and highly effective for treating ADHD. The same journal released a subsequent systematic review (2022) of extended-release methylphenidate for adults, concluding similar doubts about the certainty of evidence. Other recent systematic reviews and meta-analyses, however, find certainty in the safety and high efficacy of methylphenidate for reducing ADHD symptoms, for alleviating the underlying executive functioning deficits, and for substantially reducing the adverse consequences of untreated ADHD with continuous treatment. Clinical guidelines internationally are also consistent in approving the safety and efficacy of methylphenidate and recommending it as a first-line treatment for the disorder.

Safety and efficacy data have been reviewed extensively by medical regulators (e.g., the US Food and Drug Administration and the European Medicines Agency), the developers of evidence-based international guidelines (e.g., the UK National Institute for Health and Care Excellence and the American Academy of Pediatrics), and government agencies who have endorsed these guidelines (e.g., the Australian National Health and Medical Research Council). These professional groups unanimously conclude, based on the scientific evidence, that methylphenidate is safe and effective and should be considered as a first-line treatment for ADHD. The likelihood of developing insomnia for ADHD patients taking stimulants has been measured at between 11 and 45% for different medications, and may be a main reason for discontinuation. Other side effects, such as tics, decreased appetite and weight loss, or emotional lability, may also lead to discontinuation. Stimulant psychosis and mania are rare at therapeutic doses, appearing to occur in approximately 0.1% of individuals, within the first several weeks after starting amphetamine therapy. The safety of these medications in pregnancy is unclear. Symptom improvement is not sustained if medication is ceased.

The long-term effects of ADHD medication have yet to be fully determined, although stimulants are generally beneficial and safe for up to two years for children and adolescents. A 2022 meta-analysis found no statistically significant association between ADHD medications and the risk of cardiovascular disease (CVD) across age groups, although the study suggests further investigation is warranted for patients with preexisting CVD as well as long-term medication use. Regular monitoring has been recommended in those on long-term treatment. There are indications suggesting that stimulant therapy for children and adolescents should be stopped periodically to assess continuing need for medication, decrease possible growth delay, and reduce tolerance. Although potentially addictive at high doses, stimulants used to treat ADHD have low potential for abuse. Treatment with stimulants is either protective against substance abuse or has no effect.

The majority of studies on nicotine and other nicotinic agonists as treatments for ADHD have shown favourable results; however, no nicotinic drug has been approved for ADHD treatment. Caffeine was formerly used as a second-line treatment for ADHD, but research indicates it has no significant effects in reducing ADHD symptoms. Caffeine appears to help with alertness, arousal, and reaction time, but not the type of inattention implicated in ADHD (sustained attention/persistence). Pseudoephedrine and ephedrine do not affect ADHD symptoms.

Modafinil has shown some efficacy in reducing the severity of ADHD in children and adolescents. The only recorded side effect was increased loss of appetite. It may be prescribed off-label to treat ADHD.

==== Non-stimulants ====
Two non-stimulant medications, atomoxetine and viloxazine, are approved by the FDA and in other countries for the treatment of ADHD.

Atomoxetine, due to its lack of addiction liability, may be preferred in those who are at risk of recreational or compulsive stimulant use, although evidence is lacking to support its use over stimulants for this reason. Atomoxetine alleviates ADHD symptoms through norepinephrine reuptake and by indirectly increasing dopamine in the pre-frontal cortex, sharing 70–80% of the brain regions with stimulants in their produced effects. Atomoxetine has been shown to significantly improve academic performance. Meta-analyses and systematic reviews have found that atomoxetine has comparable efficacy, equal tolerability and response rate (75%) to methylphenidate in children and adolescents. In adults, efficacy and discontinuation rates are equivalent.

Analyses of clinical trial data suggests that viloxazine is about as effective as atomoxetine and methylphenidate but with fewer side effects.

Amantadine was shown to induce similar improvements in children treated with methylphenidate, with less frequent side effects. A 2021 retrospective study showed that amantadine may serve as an effective adjunct to stimulants for ADHD–related symptoms and appears to be a safer alternative to second- or third-generation antipsychotics.

Bupropion is also used off-label by some clinicians due to research findings. It is effective, but modestly less than atomoxetine and methylphenidate.

There is little evidence on the effects of medication on social behaviours. Antipsychotics may also be used to treat aggression in ADHD.

Alpha-2a agonists

Two alpha-2a agonists, extended-release formulations of guanfacine and clonidine, are approved by the FDA and in other countries for the treatment of ADHD (effective in children and adolescents but effectiveness has still not been shown for adults). They appear to be modestly less effective than the stimulants (amphetamine and methylphenidate) and non-stimulants (atomoxetine and viloxazine) at reducing symptoms, but can be useful alternatives or used in conjunction with a stimulant. These medications act by adjusting the alpha-2a ports on the outside of noradrenergic nerve cells in the pre-frontal executive networks, so the information (electrical signal) is less confounded by noise.

==== Guidelines ====
Guidelines on when to use medications vary by country. The United Kingdom's National Institute for Health and Care Excellence recommends use for children only in severe cases, though for adults medication is a first-line treatment. Conversely, most United States guidelines recommend medications in most age groups. Medications are especially not recommended for preschool children. Underdosing of stimulants can occur, and can result in a lack of response or later loss of effectiveness. This is particularly common in adolescents and adults as approved dosing is based on school-aged children, causing some practitioners to use weight-based or benefit-based off-label dosing instead.

=== Exercise ===
Exercise does not reduce the symptoms of ADHD according to the International Consensus Statement. This conclusion is based on two meta-analyses: one of 10 studies with 300 children and the other of 15 studies and 668 participants, which showed that exercise yields no statistically significant reductions on ADHD symptoms. A 2024 systematic review and meta analysis commissioned by the Patient-Centered Outcomes Research Institute (PCORI) identified seven studies on the effectiveness of physical exercise for treating ADHD symptoms. The type and amount of exercise varied widely across studies from martial arts interventions to treadmill training, to table tennis or aerobic exercise. Effects reported were not replicated, causing the authors to conclude that there is insufficient evidence that exercise is an effective form of treatment for ADHD symptoms.

=== Diet ===
Dietary modifications are not recommended as of 2019 by the American Academy of Pediatrics, the National Institute for Health and Care Excellence, or the Agency for Healthcare Research and Quality due to insufficient evidence. A 2013 meta-analysis found less than a third of children with ADHD see some improvement in symptoms with free fatty acid supplementation or decreased consumption of artificial food colouring. These benefits may be limited to children with food sensitivities or those who are simultaneously being treated with ADHD medications. This review also found that evidence does not support removing other foods from the diet to treat ADHD. A 2024 systematic review and meta-analysis commissioned by the PCORI Identified benefits with supplements such as zinc sulfate which had the largest effect. A 2014 review found that an elimination diet results in a small overall benefit in a minority of children, such as those with allergies. A 2016 review stated that the use of a gluten-free diet as standard ADHD treatment is not advised. A 2017 review showed that a few-foods elimination diet may help children too young to be medicated or not responding to medication, while free fatty acid supplementation or decreased eating of artificial food colouring as standard ADHD treatment is not advised.

Chronic deficiencies of iron, magnesium and iodine may have a negative impact on ADHD symptoms. There is a small amount of evidence that lower tissue zinc levels may be associated with ADHD. In the absence of a demonstrated zinc deficiency (which is rare outside of developing countries), zinc supplementation is not recommended as treatment for ADHD. However, zinc supplementation may reduce the minimum effective dose of amphetamine when it is used with amphetamine for the treatment of ADHD.

== Prognosis ==
About one to two thirds of people diagnosed in childhood continue to have ADHD in adulthood, with 2.58% of adults estimated to have ADHD which began in childhood. Children with ADHD have worse educational outcomes and a higher risk of unintentional injuries. In adults, hyperactivity is often replaced by inner restlessness, and adults affected are likely to develop coping mechanisms as they mature, thus compensating to some extent for their previous symptoms.

The negative impacts of ADHD symptoms contribute to poor health-related quality of life that may be further exacerbated by, or may increase the risk of, other psychiatric conditions such as anxiety and depression. Individuals with ADHD may also face misconceptions and stigma. A number of recent studies have found that ADHD is associated with a significant reduction in average life expectancy. A US study found rates of smoking among those with ADHD are higher than in the general population. Positive effects of medication on functional impairment and quality of life (e.g. reduced risk of accidents) have been found across multiple domains.

Individuals with ADHD are significantly overrepresented in prison populations. Although there is no generally accepted estimate of ADHD prevalence among inmates, a 2015 meta-analysis estimated a prevalence of 25.5%, and a larger 2018 meta-analysis estimated the frequency to be 26.2%.

New research in 2025 indicates that adults diagnosed with ADHD may have a shorter lifespan compared to those without the condition. The study revealed that, on average, men with ADHD lived seven years less than men without ADHD, while women with ADHD had a lifespan nine years shorter than their peers. Although the study did not pinpoint exact causes of death, it highlighted that individuals with ADHD were more likely to engage in smoking, alcohol misuse, and face other health challenges such as depression, self-harm, or personality disorders.

== Epidemiology ==
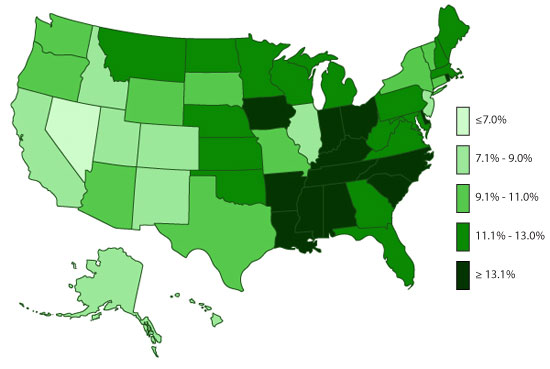
Percentages of people from ages 4 to 17 ever diagnosed in the US as of 2011

ADHD is estimated to affect about 6–7% of people aged 18 and under when diagnosed via the DSM-IV criteria. When diagnosed via the ICD-10 criteria, rates in this age group are estimated around 1–2%. Rates are similar between countries and differences in rates depend mostly on how it is diagnosed. Children in North America appear to have a higher rate of ADHD than children in Africa and the Middle East; this is believed to be due to differing methods of diagnosis rather than a difference in underlying frequency. (The same publication which describes this difference also notes that the difference may be rooted in the available studies from these respective regions, as far more studies were from North America than from Africa and the Middle East.) As of 2019, it was estimated to affect 84.7 million people globally.

ADHD is diagnosed approximately twice as often in boys as in girls, and 1.6 times more often in men than in women, although the disorder is overlooked in girls or diagnosed in later life because their symptoms sometimes differ from diagnostic criteria. In 2014, Keith Conners, one of the early advocates for recognition of the disorder, spoke out against overdiagnosis in a New York Times article. In contrast, a 2014 peer-reviewed medical literature review indicated that ADHD is underdiagnosed in adults.

Studies from multiple countries have reported that children born closer to the start of the school year are more frequently diagnosed with and medicated for ADHD than their older classmates. Boys who were born in December where the school age cut-off was 31 December were shown to be 30% more likely to be diagnosed and 41% more likely to be treated than those born in January. Girls born in December had a diagnosis and treatment percentage increase of 70% and 77% respectively compared to those born in January. Children who were born at the last three days of a calendar year were reported to have significantly higher levels of diagnosis and treatment for ADHD than children born at the first three days of a calendar year. The studies suggest that ADHD diagnosis is prone to subjective analysis.

Rates of diagnosis and treatment have increased in both the United Kingdom and the United States since the 1970s. Prior to 1970, it was rare for children to be diagnosed with ADHD, while in the 1970s rates were about 1%. This is believed to be primarily due to changes in how the condition is diagnosed and how readily people are willing to treat it with medications rather than a true change in incidence. With widely differing rates of diagnosis across countries, states within countries, races, and ethnicities, some suspect factors other than symptoms of ADHD are playing a role in diagnosis, such as cultural norms.

Despite showing a higher frequency of symptoms associated with ADHD, non-White children in the US are less likely than White children to be diagnosed or treated for ADHD, a finding that is often explained by bias among health professionals, as well as parents who may be reluctant to acknowledge that their child has ADHD. Crosscultural differences in diagnosis of ADHD can also be attributed to the long-lasting effects of harmful, racially targeted medical practices. Medical pseudosciences, particularly those that targeted Black populations during the period of slavery in the US, lead to a distrust of medical practices within certain communities. The combination of ADHD symptoms often being regarded as misbehaviour rather than as a psychiatric condition, and the use of drugs to regulate ADHD, result in a hesitancy to trust a diagnosis of ADHD. Cases of misdiagnosis in ADHD can also occur due to stereotyping of people of colour. Due to ADHD's subjectively determined symptoms, medical professionals may diagnose individuals based on stereotyped behaviour or misdiagnose due to cultural differences in symptom presentation.

A 2024 study in CDC's Morbidity and Mortality Weekly Report reports about 15.5 million U.S. adults have attention-deficit hyperactivity disorder, with many facing challenges in accessing treatment. One-third of diagnosed individuals had received a prescription for a stimulant drug in the past year but nearly three-quarters of them reported difficulties filling the prescription due to medication shortages.

== History ==
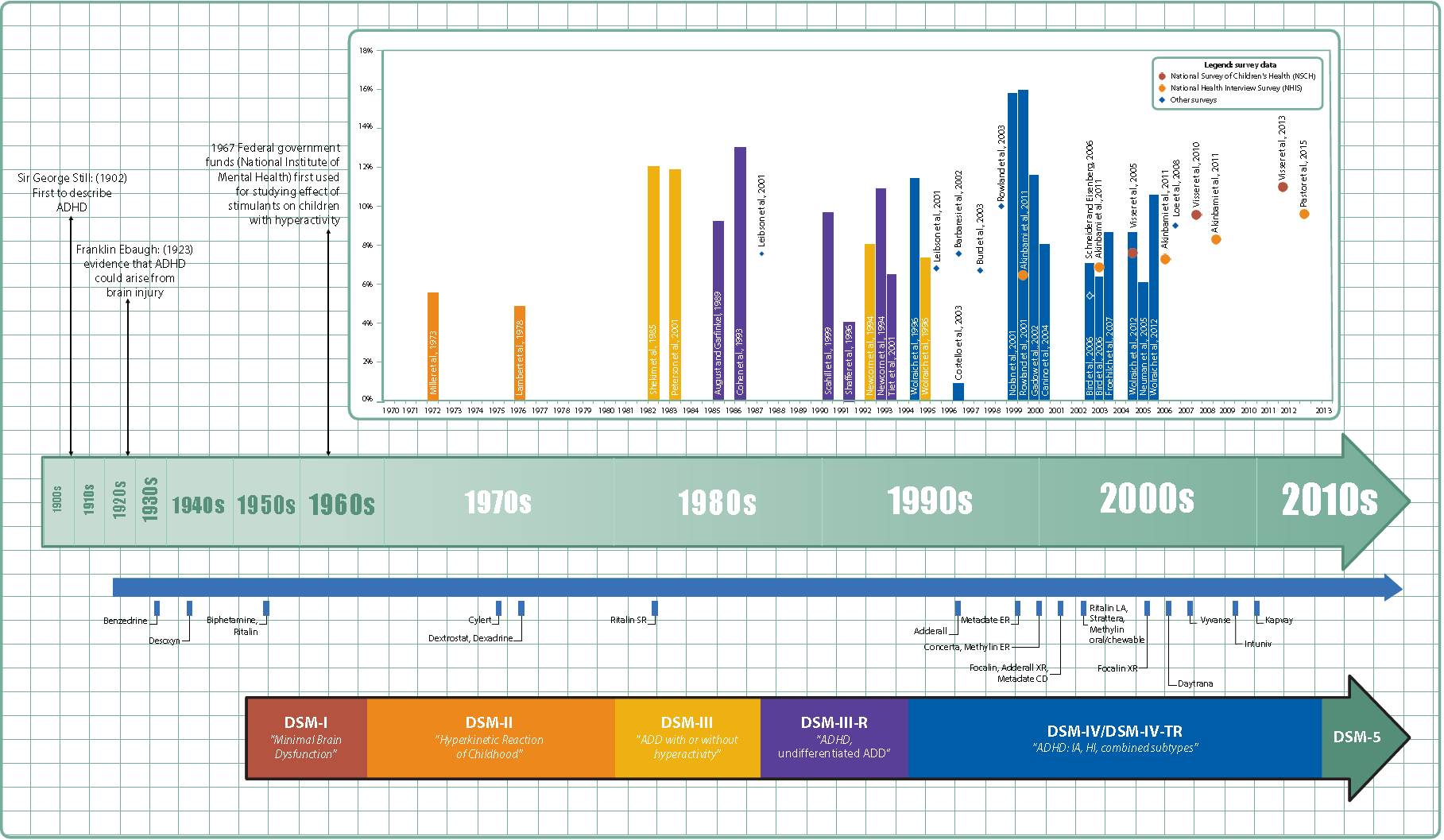
Timeline of ADHD diagnostic criteria, prevalence, and treatment

ADHD was officially known as attention deficit disorder (ADD) from 1980 to 1987; prior to the 1980s, it was known as hyperkinetic reaction of childhood. Symptoms similar to those of ADHD have been described in medical literature dating back to the 18th century. Sir Alexander Crichton describes "mental restlessness" in his book An inquiry into the nature and origin of mental derangement written in 1798. He made observations about children showing signs of being inattentive and having the "fidgets". The first clear description of ADHD is credited to George Still in 1902 during a series of lectures he gave to the Royal College of Physicians of London.

The terminology used to describe the condition has changed over time and has included: minimal brain dysfunction in the DSM-I (1952, also called minimal cerebral dysfunction), hyperkinetic reaction of childhood in the DSM-II (1968), and attention-deficit disorder with or without hyperactivity in the DSM-III (1980). In 1987, the symptoms of inattention, impulsivity, and hyperactivity were collectively combined to define the new diagnosis of ADHD, and in 1994 the DSM-IV in split the diagnosis into three subtypes: ADHD inattentive type, ADHD hyperactive-impulsive type, and ADHD combined type. These terms were kept in the DSM-5 in 2013 and in the DSM-5-TR in 2022. Prior to the DSM, terms included minimal brain damage in the 1930s.

ADHD, its diagnosis, and its treatment have been controversial since the 1970s. For example, positions differ on whether ADHD is within the normal range of behaviour, and the degree to which ADHD is a genetic condition. Other areas of controversy include the use of stimulant medications in children, the method of diagnosis, and the possibility of overdiagnosis. In 2009, the National Institute for Health and Care Excellence states that the current treatments and methods of diagnosis are based on the dominant view of the academic literature.

Once neuroimaging studies were possible, studies in the 1990s provided support for the pre-existing theory that neurological differences (particularly in the frontal lobes) were involved in ADHD. A genetic component was identified and ADHD was acknowledged to be a persistent, long-term disorder which lasted from childhood into adulthood. ADHD was split into the current three sub-types because of a field trial completed by Lahey and colleagues and published in 1994. In 2021, global teams of scientists curated the International Consensus Statement compiling evidence-based findings about the disorder.

In 1934, Benzedrine became the first amphetamine medication approved for use in the United States. Methylphenidate was introduced in the 1950s, and enantiopure dextroamphetamine in the 1970s. The use of stimulants to treat ADHD was first described in 1937. Psychiatrist Charles Bradley gave the children with behavioural disorders Benzedrine and found it improved academic performance and behaviour.

== Research directions ==
=== Positive traits ===
Possible positive traits of ADHD are a new avenue of research, and therefore limited.

A 2020 review found that creativity may be associated with ADHD symptoms, particularly divergent thinking and quantity of creative achievements, but not with the disorder of ADHD itself – i.e. it has not been found to be increased in people diagnosed with the disorder, only in people with subclinical symptoms or those that possess traits associated with the disorder. Divergent thinking is the ability to produce creative solutions which differ significantly from each other and consider the issue from multiple perspectives. Those with ADHD symptoms could be advantaged in this form of creativity as they tend to have diffuse attention, allowing rapid switching between aspects of the task under consideration; flexible associative memory, allowing them to remember and use more distantly related ideas which is associated with creativity; and impulsivity, allowing them to consider ideas which others may not have.

=== Biomarkers for diagnosis ===
Reviews of ADHD biomarkers have noted that platelet monoamine oxidase expression, urinary norepinephrine, urinary MHPG, and urinary phenethylamine levels consistently differ between ADHD individuals and non-ADHD controls in aggregate. These parameters could serve as prognostic biomarkers for ADHD, but more research is needed to establish their prognostic utility. Urinary and blood plasma phenethylamine concentrations are lower in ADHD individuals relative to controls. The two most commonly prescribed drugs for ADHD, amphetamine and methylphenidate, increase phenethylamine biosynthesis in treatment-responsive individuals with ADHD. Lower urinary phenethylamine concentrations are associated with symptoms of inattentiveness in ADHD individuals.

=== Biomarkers for treatment ===
There exists evidence to suggest that certain biomarkers, particularly those derived from non-invasive EEG assessment, may have potential utility in predicting response to pharmacological treatments for ADHD, with evidence relating non-pharmacological treatments being more limited. Repeated biomarker assessments indicate that different treatments are associated with distinct changes in specific neurophysiological profiles over time, which parallel treatment-related clinical improvements in some studies. However, existing research does not support any immediate clinical applications of treatment biomarkers for ADHD.

== See also ==
- Attention deficit hyperactivity disorder controversies – Controversies surrounding the topic of ADHD's nature, diagnosis, and treatment
- Directed attention fatigue – A temporary state sharing many of the symptoms of ADHD
- Self-medication – Unsupervised use of drugs and other substances
