= Disruptive Behavior Disorders Rating Scale =

- Purpose: identify ADHD

The Disruptive Behavior Disorders Rating Scale (DBDRS) is a 45-question screening measure, completed by either parents or teachers, designed to identify symptoms of attention deficit hyperactivity disorder, oppositional defiant disorder, and conduct disorder in children and adolescents.

This questionnaire was developed by Pelham and colleagues in 1992 and inspired other widely used questionnaires, including the SNAP-IV (Swanson, Nolan and Pelham Teacher and Parent Rating Scale) and the Vanderbilt ADHD Diagnostic Rating Scale (Wolraich et al., 2003). The DBDRS is freely available online.

For each question, the respondent is asked to indicate the degree to which a statement describes the child's behavior. Response options include "not at all", "just a little", "pretty much", and "very much". For any question they do not know the answer to, respondents are asked to write "DK" for "don't know". The behavioral rating scale takes 5–10 minutes to complete and is designed for use with children ages 5 and up. The scores of the scale have been shown to be reliable and valid across multiple different study samples.

== See also ==
- Attention deficit hyperactivity disorder
- Oppositional defiant disorder
