= Keith Conners =

American psychologist (1933–2017)

- Born: Carmen Keith Conners; March 20, 1933; Bingham Canyon, Utah, U.S.
- Died: July 5, 2017 (aged 84); Durham, North Carolina, U.S.
- Education: University of Chicago (BA); University of Oxford (MA); Harvard University (PhD)
- Occupation: Psychologist
- Known for: Establishing the first standards of the diagnosis for attention deficit hyperactivity disorder
- Scientific career
- Fields: Psychology

Carmen Keith Conners (March 20, 1933 – July 5, 2017) was an American psychologist, best known for establishing the first standards for the diagnosis of attention deficit hyperactivity disorder (ADHD).

Conners was born on March 20, 1933, in Bingham Canyon, Utah, one of three children of Michael Conners, a machinist, and Merle Conners, who worked in a department store. He earned degrees from the University of Chicago (BA), University of Oxford (MA), and Harvard University (PhD).

Conners is credited by many as putting ADHD on the map in the USA and helped develop early assessments for ADHD, including the Conners Comprehensive Behaviour Rating Scale. In later years, he raised concerns about the high rates of diagnosis of ADHD in the United States as compared to Europe, and suggested that ADHD may be diagnosed too frequently in the US. He believed the true rates of childhood ADHD were 2-3%.

Conners died on July 5, 2017, in Durham, North Carolina, aged 84.
