= Glucose-fructose oxidoreductase =

glucose-fructose oxidoreductase

Identifiers
- EC no.: 1.1.99.28
- CAS no.: 94949-35-6

Databases
- IntEnz: IntEnz view
- BRENDA: BRENDA entry
- ExPASy: NiceZyme view
- KEGG: KEGG entry
- MetaCyc: metabolic pathway
- PRIAM: profile
- PDB structures: RCSB PDB PDBe PDBsum
- Gene Ontology: AmiGO / QuickGO
Search
- PMC: articles
- PubMed: articles
- NCBI: proteins

In enzymology, glucose-fructose oxidoreductase (EC 1.1.99.28) is an enzyme that catalyzes the chemical reaction

D-glucose
+
D-fructose
glucono-δ-lactone
+
D-sorbitol

The two substrates of this enzyme are D-glucose and D-fructose (shown in its open-chain keto form). Its products are glucono-δ-lactone and sorbitol.

This enzyme belongs to the family of oxidoreductases, specifically those acting on the CH-OH group of donor with other acceptors. The systematic name of this enzyme class is D-glucose:D-fructose oxidoreductase.

== Structural studies ==
As of late 2007, 7 structures have been solved for this class of enzymes, with PDB accession codes 1H6A, 1H6B, 1H6C, 1H6D, 1OFG, 1RYD, and 1RYE.
