= Conners Comprehensive Behaviour Rating Scale =

Behaviour rating scale

- Purpose: To diagnose ADHD

The Conners Comprehensive Behaviour Rating Scale (CBRS) is a tool used to gain a better understanding of academic, behavioural and social issues that are seen in young children between ages 6 to 18 years old. It is frequently used to assist in the diagnosis of attention deficit hyperactivity disorder (ADHD). It helps the doctor or assessor to better understand the symptoms and their severity. If the child presents symptoms of ADHD, then usually the parents will have to undergo a CBRS test as well, after which they will compare and analyse the results, which helps the doctor create a more accurate diagnosis.

== History ==
The Conners Comprehensive Behavior Rating Scales (CBRS) were developed by C. Keith Conners to assess behavioral problems in children and adolescents. The Conners' Teacher Rating Scale, a 39-item symptom and behavior checklist designed for teachers in psychopharmacological studies, was introduced in 1969. Factor analysis of this scale identified five stable dimensions of teacher-reported symptoms, demonstrating its utility for assessing children with hyperkinetic disorders and evaluating the effects of pharmacological treatment.

The Conners' Parent Rating Scale (CPRS) was introduced in 1970 to gather parental reports on behavioral issues in children referred for psychiatric evaluation. The initial CPRS comprised 73 items, formulated from parental observations and reports. In 1973, the CPRS-93 expanded this to a 93-item questionnaire intended to identify hyperkinetic children, assess problem behaviors, and evaluate drug treatment effectiveness across 25 areas.

A revised 48-item version, the CPRS-48, was introduced in 1978. This streamlined version incorporated rewording, factor analysis for consistency, and included a Hyperactivity Index (HI) sensitive to treatment effects. Further updates in 1997 led to the development of the CPRS-R:L (80-item long version) and CPRS-R:S (27-item short version). These later revisions sought to address limitations such as small normative samples and outdated content, while also incorporating an ADHD Index and DSM-IV-aligned items. These changes were based on data from a larger, more diverse normative sample of over 2,400 children.

== Measurement ==
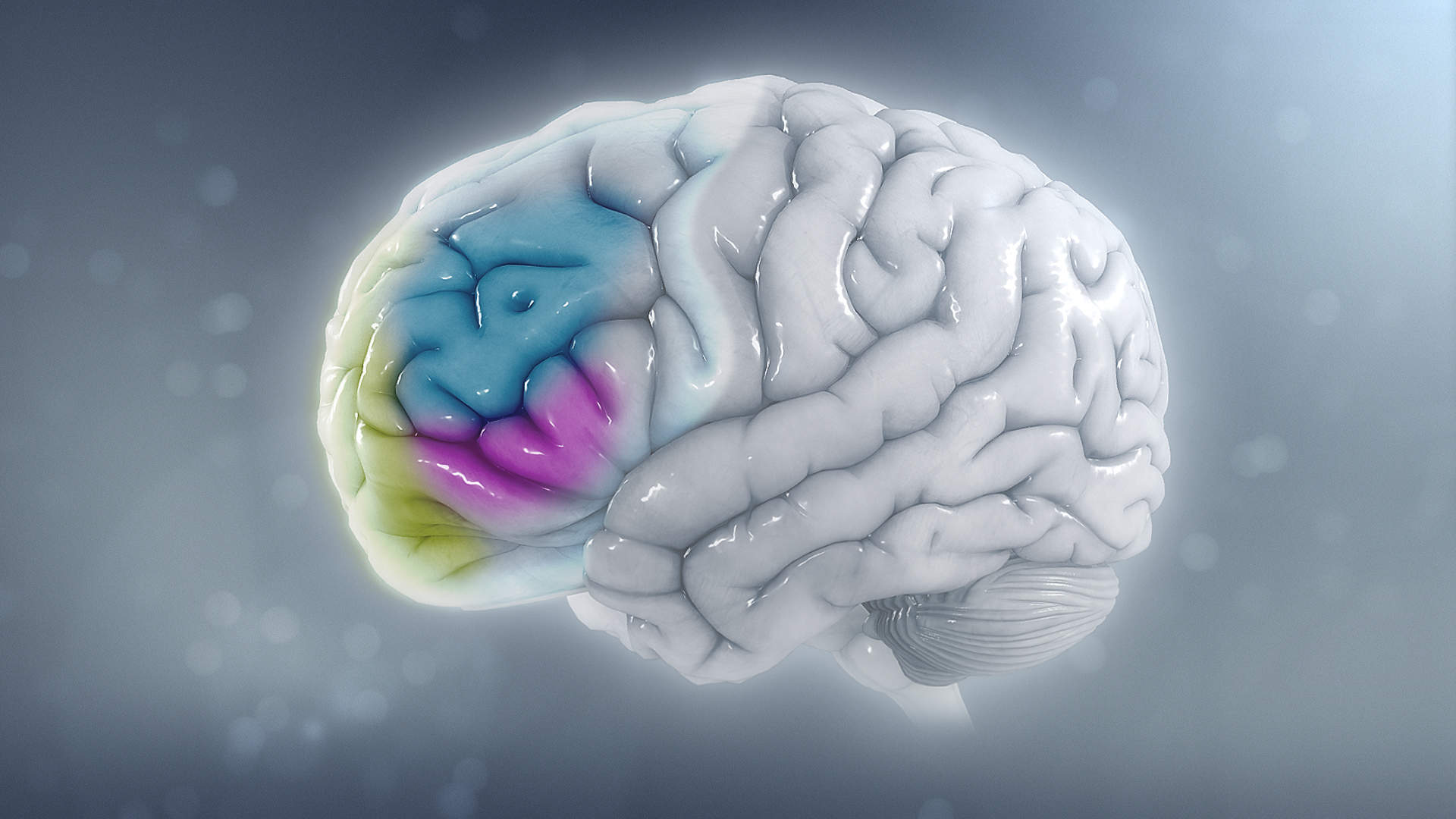
Brain of a child with ADHD with overall reduced volume and a proportional reduction in the left-sided prefrontal cortex.

The CBRS was created to evaluate possible behavioural markers in children from ages to 6–18 comprehensively. These include:

- hyperactivity
- compulsive actions
- perfectionism
- playing up in class
- violent or aggressiveness
- math difficulties
- language difficulties
- fear of separation
- social issues
- emotional anguish

The CBRS has about 18 to 90 questions about the incidence of behaviours shown by the child. These questions are supplied by the Diagnostic and Statistical Manual of Mental Disorders (DSM-5). The rating is completed by the child's parents upon initial visit to the psychologist. Possible ADHD symptoms of the child can be determined along with the significance of each. This is done by asking questions about the child's home life, giving psychologists a better understanding of the child's normal behavioural patterns and habits. An analysis of the answers to the questions will help psychologists make a more accurate diagnosis of ADHD.

== Versions ==
=== Short and long versions ===
There are two versions of the CBRS, the short and the long version. They are both used for different purposes by behavioural experts. The length of the CBRS will be based on the individual child and how in depth the proposed analysis is.

There are three Conners CBRS forms, each form contains different questions for the specific person filling the form out. The psychologists combine these answers to utilise for their analysis:

- one for parents
- one for teachers
- one that is completed by the child

These forms create a comprehensive list of the child's behaviours through the emotional, behavioural and academic screening questions asked. The questions are multiple choice, examples of the topics of these questions relate to content scales; emotional distress, aggressive behaviours, academic difficulties, hyperactivity/impulsivity, separation fears, violence potential and physical symptoms.

The short version of the CBRS is called the Conners Clinical Index (Conners CI), and can be finished in as little time as five minutes. It will consist of 25 questions with the possibility to vary depending on the child. The longer versions can take up to an hour and a half to complete.

== Case study ==
=== Vietnam ===
The CBRS is a tool that has been widely developed and used in Western countries, however there are a lack of measures and applications of these types of tools in Asian countries, specifically Vietnam. Recently these standards and measures of the CBRS have been progressively improved and developed in Vietnam and other developing countries. The introduction of the CBRS has been seen to increase the early identification and intervention of problems in Vietnamese children, leading to the mitigation of symptoms that are related to social, emotional and behavioural difficulties. These problems have been seen to influence their personal development, relationships with family, academic achievement and possibility of future psychological disorders.

The application of the CBRS will vary between different countries due to cultural differences and norms. These simple characteristic dissimilarities can affect many areas of psychology including the diagnosis made, perception of behaviour, likelihood of seeking treatment and stigma of mental health services. In Vietnam the culture prioritises interdependence within families, friends and communities, which is seen to be more important than their individual needs. This means the Vietnamese depend heavily on social supports when dealing with mental health issues.

== Results analysis ==
The results are calculated by the psychologist who totals all the areas of the assessments completed by the child, parent, and, in some cases, teacher. These scores are standardised as T-scores by comparing them to the results of children within the same age group. T-scores can also be converted into percentile ranks.

When the T-scores are less than 60, a respondent's test performance is in the normal range. However, when an average T-score is above 60, there is a possibility of behavioural issues. There are different categories:

- T-scores above 60 indicate there may be an issue regarding ADHD.
- T-scores from 61 to 70 indicate issues are lightly unusual, or moderately severe.
- T-scores above 70 indicate issues are very unusual, or more severe.

The higher a respondent's score, the higher their clinical likelihood of ADHD.

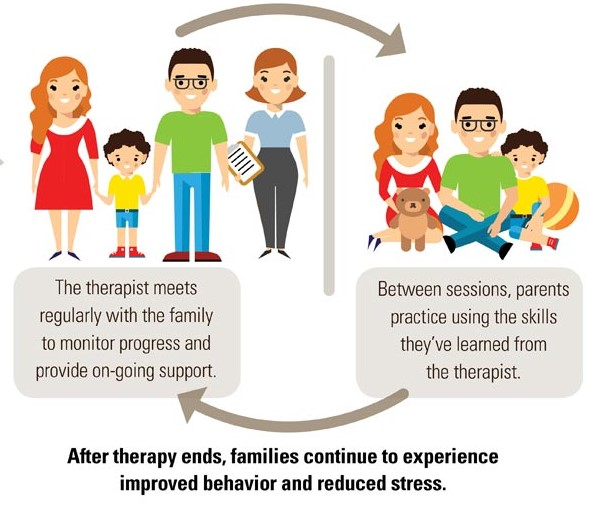
ADHD Parent training in Behavior Therapy

== Limitations ==
The CBRS tool has limitations, according to the medical assessment publisher MHS Assessments, validity analyses are used to test the correctness of the CBRS Rating Scale. They also state that the mean accuracy rate of the CBRS is 78% from all three forms. There is also the fact that assessing a child's behaviour can be subjective. This subjectivity leads to psychologists being encouraged to pair the CBRS with other tests and scales. It is not a purely objective test. However, it can help better understand a child's behavioural, social and emotional stability. Further analysis is needed to help avoid a misdiagnosis, this can be done through pairing tests with attention span tests and an ADHD symptom checklist. The CBRS rating scale is not perfect, but when used correctly by a medical professional it will help people understand a child's behaviour in more depth.
